

57001–57100 

|-bgcolor=#E9E9E9
| 57001 ||  || — || September 30, 2000 || Socorro || LINEAR || — || align=right | 3.9 km || 
|-id=002 bgcolor=#d6d6d6
| 57002 ||  || — || September 23, 2000 || Socorro || LINEAR || — || align=right | 5.6 km || 
|-id=003 bgcolor=#d6d6d6
| 57003 ||  || — || September 30, 2000 || Anderson Mesa || LONEOS || — || align=right | 10 km || 
|-id=004 bgcolor=#FA8072
| 57004 ||  || — || September 28, 2000 || Anderson Mesa || LONEOS || — || align=right | 2.7 km || 
|-id=005 bgcolor=#d6d6d6
| 57005 ||  || — || September 29, 2000 || Anderson Mesa || LONEOS || EOS || align=right | 5.5 km || 
|-id=006 bgcolor=#d6d6d6
| 57006 ||  || — || September 29, 2000 || Anderson Mesa || LONEOS || EOS || align=right | 5.7 km || 
|-id=007 bgcolor=#d6d6d6
| 57007 ||  || — || September 29, 2000 || Anderson Mesa || LONEOS || URS || align=right | 9.2 km || 
|-id=008 bgcolor=#E9E9E9
| 57008 ||  || — || September 28, 2000 || Anderson Mesa || LONEOS || EUN || align=right | 3.9 km || 
|-id=009 bgcolor=#d6d6d6
| 57009 ||  || — || September 28, 2000 || Anderson Mesa || LONEOS || — || align=right | 8.2 km || 
|-id=010 bgcolor=#E9E9E9
| 57010 ||  || — || October 3, 2000 || Prescott || P. G. Comba || — || align=right | 7.7 km || 
|-id=011 bgcolor=#d6d6d6
| 57011 ||  || — || October 1, 2000 || Socorro || LINEAR || — || align=right | 5.2 km || 
|-id=012 bgcolor=#d6d6d6
| 57012 ||  || — || October 1, 2000 || Socorro || LINEAR || VER || align=right | 7.2 km || 
|-id=013 bgcolor=#C2FFFF
| 57013 ||  || — || October 1, 2000 || Socorro || LINEAR || L5 || align=right | 24 km || 
|-id=014 bgcolor=#d6d6d6
| 57014 ||  || — || October 1, 2000 || Socorro || LINEAR || — || align=right | 9.4 km || 
|-id=015 bgcolor=#E9E9E9
| 57015 ||  || — || October 1, 2000 || Socorro || LINEAR || EUN || align=right | 4.2 km || 
|-id=016 bgcolor=#d6d6d6
| 57016 ||  || — || October 1, 2000 || Socorro || LINEAR || — || align=right | 4.4 km || 
|-id=017 bgcolor=#d6d6d6
| 57017 ||  || — || October 1, 2000 || Socorro || LINEAR || EOS || align=right | 4.9 km || 
|-id=018 bgcolor=#d6d6d6
| 57018 ||  || — || October 1, 2000 || Anderson Mesa || LONEOS || — || align=right | 6.0 km || 
|-id=019 bgcolor=#E9E9E9
| 57019 ||  || — || October 2, 2000 || Anderson Mesa || LONEOS || EUN || align=right | 4.1 km || 
|-id=020 bgcolor=#E9E9E9
| 57020 ||  || — || October 2, 2000 || Anderson Mesa || LONEOS || EUN || align=right | 4.4 km || 
|-id=021 bgcolor=#d6d6d6
| 57021 ||  || — || October 2, 2000 || Anderson Mesa || LONEOS || — || align=right | 11 km || 
|-id=022 bgcolor=#d6d6d6
| 57022 ||  || — || October 5, 2000 || Socorro || LINEAR || — || align=right | 9.2 km || 
|-id=023 bgcolor=#d6d6d6
| 57023 ||  || — || October 24, 2000 || Socorro || LINEAR || — || align=right | 6.3 km || 
|-id=024 bgcolor=#d6d6d6
| 57024 ||  || — || October 24, 2000 || Socorro || LINEAR || — || align=right | 9.8 km || 
|-id=025 bgcolor=#d6d6d6
| 57025 ||  || — || October 24, 2000 || Socorro || LINEAR || — || align=right | 4.9 km || 
|-id=026 bgcolor=#d6d6d6
| 57026 ||  || — || October 24, 2000 || Socorro || LINEAR || — || align=right | 8.3 km || 
|-id=027 bgcolor=#d6d6d6
| 57027 ||  || — || October 25, 2000 || Socorro || LINEAR || 3:2moon || align=right | 11 km || 
|-id=028 bgcolor=#d6d6d6
| 57028 ||  || — || October 25, 2000 || Socorro || LINEAR || HYG || align=right | 6.6 km || 
|-id=029 bgcolor=#d6d6d6
| 57029 ||  || — || October 25, 2000 || Socorro || LINEAR || HYG || align=right | 5.3 km || 
|-id=030 bgcolor=#d6d6d6
| 57030 ||  || — || October 25, 2000 || Socorro || LINEAR || — || align=right | 6.6 km || 
|-id=031 bgcolor=#fefefe
| 57031 || 2000 VA || — || November 1, 2000 || Fountain Hills || C. W. Juels || — || align=right | 2.8 km || 
|-id=032 bgcolor=#d6d6d6
| 57032 ||  || — || November 1, 2000 || Socorro || LINEAR || — || align=right | 7.3 km || 
|-id=033 bgcolor=#d6d6d6
| 57033 ||  || — || November 1, 2000 || Socorro || LINEAR || — || align=right | 5.1 km || 
|-id=034 bgcolor=#d6d6d6
| 57034 ||  || — || November 3, 2000 || Socorro || LINEAR || URS || align=right | 12 km || 
|-id=035 bgcolor=#E9E9E9
| 57035 ||  || — || November 20, 2000 || Socorro || LINEAR || — || align=right | 3.6 km || 
|-id=036 bgcolor=#fefefe
| 57036 ||  || — || November 18, 2000 || Socorro || LINEAR || PHO || align=right | 3.8 km || 
|-id=037 bgcolor=#fefefe
| 57037 ||  || — || December 28, 2000 || Socorro || LINEAR || — || align=right | 3.2 km || 
|-id=038 bgcolor=#fefefe
| 57038 ||  || — || January 3, 2001 || Anderson Mesa || LONEOS || — || align=right | 3.0 km || 
|-id=039 bgcolor=#d6d6d6
| 57039 ||  || — || February 19, 2001 || Socorro || LINEAR || — || align=right | 6.4 km || 
|-id=040 bgcolor=#fefefe
| 57040 ||  || — || February 22, 2001 || Socorro || LINEAR || — || align=right | 1.6 km || 
|-id=041 bgcolor=#C2FFFF
| 57041 ||  || — || March 4, 2001 || Socorro || LINEAR || L4 || align=right | 22 km || 
|-id=042 bgcolor=#fefefe
| 57042 ||  || — || March 15, 2001 || Anderson Mesa || LONEOS || — || align=right | 1.3 km || 
|-id=043 bgcolor=#fefefe
| 57043 ||  || — || March 19, 2001 || Anderson Mesa || LONEOS || MAS || align=right | 2.1 km || 
|-id=044 bgcolor=#d6d6d6
| 57044 ||  || — || April 16, 2001 || Anderson Mesa || LONEOS || — || align=right | 6.0 km || 
|-id=045 bgcolor=#E9E9E9
| 57045 ||  || — || May 18, 2001 || Socorro || LINEAR || — || align=right | 4.7 km || 
|-id=046 bgcolor=#E9E9E9
| 57046 ||  || — || May 22, 2001 || Socorro || LINEAR || DOR || align=right | 6.2 km || 
|-id=047 bgcolor=#FA8072
| 57047 ||  || — || June 13, 2001 || Socorro || LINEAR || — || align=right | 3.2 km || 
|-id=048 bgcolor=#fefefe
| 57048 ||  || — || June 15, 2001 || Palomar || NEAT || ERI || align=right | 4.5 km || 
|-id=049 bgcolor=#E9E9E9
| 57049 ||  || — || June 15, 2001 || Socorro || LINEAR || — || align=right | 7.4 km || 
|-id=050 bgcolor=#E9E9E9
| 57050 ||  || — || June 15, 2001 || Socorro || LINEAR || — || align=right | 6.9 km || 
|-id=051 bgcolor=#fefefe
| 57051 ||  || — || June 15, 2001 || Socorro || LINEAR || — || align=right | 3.4 km || 
|-id=052 bgcolor=#E9E9E9
| 57052 ||  || — || June 22, 2001 || Palomar || NEAT || — || align=right | 2.4 km || 
|-id=053 bgcolor=#E9E9E9
| 57053 ||  || — || June 23, 2001 || Palomar || NEAT || — || align=right | 4.2 km || 
|-id=054 bgcolor=#E9E9E9
| 57054 ||  || — || June 23, 2001 || Palomar || NEAT || — || align=right | 3.2 km || 
|-id=055 bgcolor=#fefefe
| 57055 ||  || — || June 26, 2001 || Palomar || NEAT || FLO || align=right | 2.7 km || 
|-id=056 bgcolor=#E9E9E9
| 57056 ||  || — || June 25, 2001 || Palomar || NEAT || — || align=right | 3.4 km || 
|-id=057 bgcolor=#fefefe
| 57057 ||  || — || June 25, 2001 || Palomar || NEAT || NYS || align=right | 2.2 km || 
|-id=058 bgcolor=#fefefe
| 57058 ||  || — || June 25, 2001 || Palomar || NEAT || KLI || align=right | 4.2 km || 
|-id=059 bgcolor=#fefefe
| 57059 ||  || — || June 27, 2001 || Haleakala || NEAT || — || align=right | 2.6 km || 
|-id=060 bgcolor=#fefefe
| 57060 ||  || — || June 17, 2001 || Palomar || NEAT || FLO || align=right | 1.8 km || 
|-id=061 bgcolor=#E9E9E9
| 57061 ||  || — || June 19, 2001 || Haleakala || NEAT || WAT || align=right | 6.2 km || 
|-id=062 bgcolor=#fefefe
| 57062 ||  || — || July 12, 2001 || Palomar || NEAT || — || align=right | 1.8 km || 
|-id=063 bgcolor=#E9E9E9
| 57063 ||  || — || July 13, 2001 || Palomar || NEAT || — || align=right | 2.8 km || 
|-id=064 bgcolor=#fefefe
| 57064 ||  || — || July 14, 2001 || Palomar || NEAT || — || align=right | 1.3 km || 
|-id=065 bgcolor=#fefefe
| 57065 ||  || — || July 14, 2001 || Palomar || NEAT || ERI || align=right | 5.1 km || 
|-id=066 bgcolor=#fefefe
| 57066 ||  || — || July 14, 2001 || Palomar || NEAT || FLO || align=right | 1.3 km || 
|-id=067 bgcolor=#fefefe
| 57067 ||  || — || July 14, 2001 || Palomar || NEAT || — || align=right | 1.8 km || 
|-id=068 bgcolor=#fefefe
| 57068 ||  || — || July 17, 2001 || Haleakala || NEAT || NYS || align=right | 3.0 km || 
|-id=069 bgcolor=#E9E9E9
| 57069 ||  || — || July 19, 2001 || Reedy Creek || J. Broughton || — || align=right | 2.9 km || 
|-id=070 bgcolor=#d6d6d6
| 57070 ||  || — || July 17, 2001 || Anderson Mesa || LONEOS || EOS || align=right | 5.8 km || 
|-id=071 bgcolor=#fefefe
| 57071 ||  || — || July 17, 2001 || Anderson Mesa || LONEOS || FLO || align=right | 2.1 km || 
|-id=072 bgcolor=#E9E9E9
| 57072 ||  || — || July 20, 2001 || Palomar || NEAT || — || align=right | 5.3 km || 
|-id=073 bgcolor=#fefefe
| 57073 ||  || — || July 21, 2001 || Reedy Creek || J. Broughton || KLI || align=right | 5.1 km || 
|-id=074 bgcolor=#E9E9E9
| 57074 ||  || — || July 20, 2001 || Socorro || LINEAR || — || align=right | 2.9 km || 
|-id=075 bgcolor=#fefefe
| 57075 ||  || — || July 20, 2001 || Socorro || LINEAR || — || align=right | 2.3 km || 
|-id=076 bgcolor=#E9E9E9
| 57076 ||  || — || July 22, 2001 || San Marcello || A. Boattini, M. Tombelli || — || align=right | 3.8 km || 
|-id=077 bgcolor=#E9E9E9
| 57077 ||  || — || July 17, 2001 || Haleakala || NEAT || — || align=right | 3.0 km || 
|-id=078 bgcolor=#fefefe
| 57078 ||  || — || July 17, 2001 || Haleakala || NEAT || — || align=right | 4.6 km || 
|-id=079 bgcolor=#E9E9E9
| 57079 ||  || — || July 21, 2001 || Anderson Mesa || LONEOS || EUN || align=right | 4.9 km || 
|-id=080 bgcolor=#fefefe
| 57080 ||  || — || July 21, 2001 || Anderson Mesa || LONEOS || V || align=right | 2.2 km || 
|-id=081 bgcolor=#fefefe
| 57081 ||  || — || July 21, 2001 || Anderson Mesa || LONEOS || V || align=right | 2.0 km || 
|-id=082 bgcolor=#E9E9E9
| 57082 ||  || — || July 21, 2001 || Anderson Mesa || LONEOS || — || align=right | 3.2 km || 
|-id=083 bgcolor=#fefefe
| 57083 ||  || — || July 19, 2001 || Palomar || NEAT || PHO || align=right | 5.5 km || 
|-id=084 bgcolor=#fefefe
| 57084 ||  || — || July 20, 2001 || Palomar || NEAT || PHO || align=right | 2.3 km || 
|-id=085 bgcolor=#fefefe
| 57085 ||  || — || July 20, 2001 || Palomar || NEAT || H || align=right | 2.1 km || 
|-id=086 bgcolor=#E9E9E9
| 57086 ||  || — || July 20, 2001 || Palomar || NEAT || RAF || align=right | 3.5 km || 
|-id=087 bgcolor=#fefefe
| 57087 ||  || — || July 21, 2001 || Palomar || NEAT || — || align=right | 2.2 km || 
|-id=088 bgcolor=#fefefe
| 57088 ||  || — || July 21, 2001 || Haleakala || NEAT || FLO || align=right | 2.0 km || 
|-id=089 bgcolor=#d6d6d6
| 57089 ||  || — || July 22, 2001 || Palomar || NEAT || — || align=right | 8.0 km || 
|-id=090 bgcolor=#d6d6d6
| 57090 ||  || — || July 23, 2001 || Palomar || NEAT || — || align=right | 8.4 km || 
|-id=091 bgcolor=#E9E9E9
| 57091 ||  || — || July 23, 2001 || Palomar || NEAT || — || align=right | 3.4 km || 
|-id=092 bgcolor=#E9E9E9
| 57092 ||  || — || July 16, 2001 || Anderson Mesa || LONEOS || — || align=right | 2.6 km || 
|-id=093 bgcolor=#fefefe
| 57093 ||  || — || July 16, 2001 || Anderson Mesa || LONEOS || FLO || align=right | 1.7 km || 
|-id=094 bgcolor=#fefefe
| 57094 ||  || — || July 16, 2001 || Haleakala || NEAT || — || align=right | 1.8 km || 
|-id=095 bgcolor=#E9E9E9
| 57095 ||  || — || July 16, 2001 || Haleakala || NEAT || — || align=right | 2.5 km || 
|-id=096 bgcolor=#E9E9E9
| 57096 ||  || — || July 26, 2001 || Palomar || NEAT || EUN || align=right | 4.3 km || 
|-id=097 bgcolor=#fefefe
| 57097 ||  || — || July 20, 2001 || Palomar || NEAT || NYS || align=right | 4.0 km || 
|-id=098 bgcolor=#E9E9E9
| 57098 ||  || — || July 22, 2001 || Socorro || LINEAR || — || align=right | 8.6 km || 
|-id=099 bgcolor=#fefefe
| 57099 ||  || — || July 19, 2001 || Anderson Mesa || LONEOS || — || align=right | 1.8 km || 
|-id=100 bgcolor=#E9E9E9
| 57100 ||  || — || July 19, 2001 || Anderson Mesa || LONEOS || — || align=right | 7.4 km || 
|}

57101–57200 

|-bgcolor=#E9E9E9
| 57101 ||  || — || July 19, 2001 || Anderson Mesa || LONEOS || — || align=right | 3.0 km || 
|-id=102 bgcolor=#fefefe
| 57102 ||  || — || July 20, 2001 || Palomar || NEAT || V || align=right | 1.7 km || 
|-id=103 bgcolor=#fefefe
| 57103 ||  || — || July 21, 2001 || Anderson Mesa || LONEOS || NYS || align=right | 1.5 km || 
|-id=104 bgcolor=#fefefe
| 57104 ||  || — || July 21, 2001 || Anderson Mesa || LONEOS || V || align=right | 3.7 km || 
|-id=105 bgcolor=#fefefe
| 57105 ||  || — || July 21, 2001 || Anderson Mesa || LONEOS || — || align=right | 1.9 km || 
|-id=106 bgcolor=#fefefe
| 57106 ||  || — || July 21, 2001 || Kitt Peak || Spacewatch || — || align=right | 2.3 km || 
|-id=107 bgcolor=#fefefe
| 57107 ||  || — || July 16, 2001 || Haleakala || NEAT || — || align=right | 2.1 km || 
|-id=108 bgcolor=#d6d6d6
| 57108 ||  || — || July 29, 2001 || Socorro || LINEAR || — || align=right | 22 km || 
|-id=109 bgcolor=#fefefe
| 57109 ||  || — || July 29, 2001 || Socorro || LINEAR || H || align=right | 2.0 km || 
|-id=110 bgcolor=#E9E9E9
| 57110 ||  || — || July 29, 2001 || Palomar || NEAT || — || align=right | 6.1 km || 
|-id=111 bgcolor=#E9E9E9
| 57111 ||  || — || July 29, 2001 || Socorro || LINEAR || — || align=right | 5.4 km || 
|-id=112 bgcolor=#E9E9E9
| 57112 ||  || — || July 29, 2001 || Socorro || LINEAR || GEF || align=right | 5.0 km || 
|-id=113 bgcolor=#fefefe
| 57113 ||  || — || July 30, 2001 || Palomar || NEAT || — || align=right | 1.8 km || 
|-id=114 bgcolor=#E9E9E9
| 57114 ||  || — || July 21, 2001 || Anderson Mesa || LONEOS || — || align=right | 2.5 km || 
|-id=115 bgcolor=#d6d6d6
| 57115 ||  || — || July 30, 2001 || Palomar || NEAT || — || align=right | 9.1 km || 
|-id=116 bgcolor=#fefefe
| 57116 ||  || — || July 22, 2001 || Socorro || LINEAR || H || align=right | 1.7 km || 
|-id=117 bgcolor=#fefefe
| 57117 ||  || — || July 26, 2001 || Palomar || NEAT || — || align=right | 1.7 km || 
|-id=118 bgcolor=#fefefe
| 57118 ||  || — || July 29, 2001 || Palomar || NEAT || — || align=right | 2.7 km || 
|-id=119 bgcolor=#fefefe
| 57119 ||  || — || July 25, 2001 || Haleakala || NEAT || V || align=right | 1.5 km || 
|-id=120 bgcolor=#d6d6d6
| 57120 ||  || — || July 25, 2001 || Haleakala || NEAT || — || align=right | 10 km || 
|-id=121 bgcolor=#E9E9E9
| 57121 ||  || — || July 25, 2001 || Haleakala || NEAT || — || align=right | 2.4 km || 
|-id=122 bgcolor=#fefefe
| 57122 ||  || — || July 27, 2001 || Anderson Mesa || LONEOS || NYS || align=right | 3.5 km || 
|-id=123 bgcolor=#fefefe
| 57123 ||  || — || July 27, 2001 || Anderson Mesa || LONEOS || V || align=right | 1.8 km || 
|-id=124 bgcolor=#d6d6d6
| 57124 ||  || — || July 27, 2001 || Haleakala || NEAT || THM || align=right | 10 km || 
|-id=125 bgcolor=#d6d6d6
| 57125 ||  || — || July 29, 2001 || Anderson Mesa || LONEOS || — || align=right | 7.2 km || 
|-id=126 bgcolor=#fefefe
| 57126 ||  || — || July 29, 2001 || Socorro || LINEAR || — || align=right | 2.4 km || 
|-id=127 bgcolor=#fefefe
| 57127 ||  || — || July 29, 2001 || Socorro || LINEAR || — || align=right | 2.3 km || 
|-id=128 bgcolor=#E9E9E9
| 57128 || 2001 PG || — || August 3, 2001 || Haleakala || NEAT || — || align=right | 4.0 km || 
|-id=129 bgcolor=#E9E9E9
| 57129 || 2001 PO || — || August 5, 2001 || Haleakala || NEAT || HNS || align=right | 3.5 km || 
|-id=130 bgcolor=#d6d6d6
| 57130 ||  || — || August 9, 2001 || Palomar || NEAT || — || align=right | 5.9 km || 
|-id=131 bgcolor=#fefefe
| 57131 ||  || — || August 10, 2001 || Haleakala || NEAT || — || align=right | 4.2 km || 
|-id=132 bgcolor=#d6d6d6
| 57132 ||  || — || August 10, 2001 || Haleakala || NEAT || — || align=right | 6.5 km || 
|-id=133 bgcolor=#E9E9E9
| 57133 ||  || — || August 10, 2001 || Haleakala || NEAT || AGN || align=right | 3.1 km || 
|-id=134 bgcolor=#E9E9E9
| 57134 ||  || — || August 10, 2001 || Haleakala || NEAT || — || align=right | 3.7 km || 
|-id=135 bgcolor=#fefefe
| 57135 ||  || — || August 10, 2001 || Haleakala || NEAT || V || align=right | 1.6 km || 
|-id=136 bgcolor=#fefefe
| 57136 ||  || — || August 10, 2001 || Haleakala || NEAT || — || align=right | 4.7 km || 
|-id=137 bgcolor=#fefefe
| 57137 ||  || — || August 11, 2001 || Palomar || NEAT || — || align=right | 1.9 km || 
|-id=138 bgcolor=#fefefe
| 57138 ||  || — || August 11, 2001 || Haleakala || NEAT || — || align=right | 4.0 km || 
|-id=139 bgcolor=#E9E9E9
| 57139 ||  || — || August 11, 2001 || Haleakala || NEAT || WIT || align=right | 3.4 km || 
|-id=140 bgcolor=#fefefe
| 57140 Gaddi ||  ||  || August 15, 2001 || San Marcello || L. Tesi, A. Boattini || NYS || align=right | 1.7 km || 
|-id=141 bgcolor=#fefefe
| 57141 ||  || — || August 10, 2001 || Palomar || NEAT || — || align=right | 1.8 km || 
|-id=142 bgcolor=#fefefe
| 57142 ||  || — || August 11, 2001 || Palomar || NEAT || — || align=right | 2.3 km || 
|-id=143 bgcolor=#E9E9E9
| 57143 ||  || — || August 11, 2001 || Palomar || NEAT || — || align=right | 5.1 km || 
|-id=144 bgcolor=#fefefe
| 57144 ||  || — || August 13, 2001 || Haleakala || NEAT || V || align=right | 1.7 km || 
|-id=145 bgcolor=#fefefe
| 57145 ||  || — || August 14, 2001 || Haleakala || NEAT || — || align=right | 1.5 km || 
|-id=146 bgcolor=#E9E9E9
| 57146 ||  || — || August 12, 2001 || Palomar || NEAT || MAR || align=right | 2.7 km || 
|-id=147 bgcolor=#fefefe
| 57147 ||  || — || August 14, 2001 || Palomar || NEAT || — || align=right | 1.7 km || 
|-id=148 bgcolor=#fefefe
| 57148 ||  || — || August 14, 2001 || Haleakala || NEAT || ERI || align=right | 1.7 km || 
|-id=149 bgcolor=#d6d6d6
| 57149 ||  || — || August 14, 2001 || Haleakala || NEAT || — || align=right | 10 km || 
|-id=150 bgcolor=#fefefe
| 57150 ||  || — || August 16, 2001 || Socorro || LINEAR || — || align=right | 2.0 km || 
|-id=151 bgcolor=#E9E9E9
| 57151 ||  || — || August 16, 2001 || Socorro || LINEAR || — || align=right | 3.3 km || 
|-id=152 bgcolor=#d6d6d6
| 57152 ||  || — || August 17, 2001 || Reedy Creek || J. Broughton || — || align=right | 12 km || 
|-id=153 bgcolor=#fefefe
| 57153 ||  || — || August 16, 2001 || Socorro || LINEAR || ERI || align=right | 5.8 km || 
|-id=154 bgcolor=#fefefe
| 57154 ||  || — || August 16, 2001 || Socorro || LINEAR || — || align=right | 1.9 km || 
|-id=155 bgcolor=#fefefe
| 57155 ||  || — || August 16, 2001 || Socorro || LINEAR || — || align=right | 2.5 km || 
|-id=156 bgcolor=#fefefe
| 57156 ||  || — || August 16, 2001 || Socorro || LINEAR || NYS || align=right | 2.0 km || 
|-id=157 bgcolor=#fefefe
| 57157 ||  || — || August 16, 2001 || Socorro || LINEAR || FLO || align=right | 2.1 km || 
|-id=158 bgcolor=#fefefe
| 57158 ||  || — || August 16, 2001 || Socorro || LINEAR || FLO || align=right | 1.7 km || 
|-id=159 bgcolor=#fefefe
| 57159 ||  || — || August 16, 2001 || Socorro || LINEAR || FLO || align=right | 2.2 km || 
|-id=160 bgcolor=#E9E9E9
| 57160 ||  || — || August 16, 2001 || Socorro || LINEAR || — || align=right | 3.0 km || 
|-id=161 bgcolor=#E9E9E9
| 57161 ||  || — || August 16, 2001 || Socorro || LINEAR || — || align=right | 6.4 km || 
|-id=162 bgcolor=#E9E9E9
| 57162 ||  || — || August 16, 2001 || Socorro || LINEAR || — || align=right | 2.8 km || 
|-id=163 bgcolor=#fefefe
| 57163 ||  || — || August 16, 2001 || Socorro || LINEAR || NYS || align=right | 2.4 km || 
|-id=164 bgcolor=#E9E9E9
| 57164 ||  || — || August 16, 2001 || Socorro || LINEAR || RAF || align=right | 2.9 km || 
|-id=165 bgcolor=#E9E9E9
| 57165 ||  || — || August 16, 2001 || Socorro || LINEAR || — || align=right | 1.8 km || 
|-id=166 bgcolor=#fefefe
| 57166 ||  || — || August 16, 2001 || Socorro || LINEAR || — || align=right | 2.1 km || 
|-id=167 bgcolor=#fefefe
| 57167 ||  || — || August 16, 2001 || Socorro || LINEAR || — || align=right | 2.3 km || 
|-id=168 bgcolor=#fefefe
| 57168 ||  || — || August 16, 2001 || Socorro || LINEAR || — || align=right | 1.4 km || 
|-id=169 bgcolor=#E9E9E9
| 57169 ||  || — || August 16, 2001 || Socorro || LINEAR || — || align=right | 5.0 km || 
|-id=170 bgcolor=#E9E9E9
| 57170 ||  || — || August 16, 2001 || Socorro || LINEAR || — || align=right | 2.5 km || 
|-id=171 bgcolor=#fefefe
| 57171 ||  || — || August 16, 2001 || Socorro || LINEAR || — || align=right | 2.5 km || 
|-id=172 bgcolor=#E9E9E9
| 57172 ||  || — || August 16, 2001 || Socorro || LINEAR || — || align=right | 3.2 km || 
|-id=173 bgcolor=#E9E9E9
| 57173 ||  || — || August 16, 2001 || Socorro || LINEAR || EUN || align=right | 3.4 km || 
|-id=174 bgcolor=#E9E9E9
| 57174 ||  || — || August 16, 2001 || Socorro || LINEAR || — || align=right | 5.0 km || 
|-id=175 bgcolor=#fefefe
| 57175 ||  || — || August 16, 2001 || Socorro || LINEAR || NYS || align=right | 1.9 km || 
|-id=176 bgcolor=#fefefe
| 57176 ||  || — || August 16, 2001 || Socorro || LINEAR || — || align=right | 6.1 km || 
|-id=177 bgcolor=#fefefe
| 57177 ||  || — || August 16, 2001 || Socorro || LINEAR || — || align=right | 1.7 km || 
|-id=178 bgcolor=#E9E9E9
| 57178 ||  || — || August 16, 2001 || Socorro || LINEAR || — || align=right | 4.8 km || 
|-id=179 bgcolor=#fefefe
| 57179 ||  || — || August 16, 2001 || Socorro || LINEAR || — || align=right | 4.6 km || 
|-id=180 bgcolor=#E9E9E9
| 57180 ||  || — || August 16, 2001 || Socorro || LINEAR || — || align=right | 3.2 km || 
|-id=181 bgcolor=#E9E9E9
| 57181 ||  || — || August 16, 2001 || Socorro || LINEAR || — || align=right | 2.9 km || 
|-id=182 bgcolor=#E9E9E9
| 57182 ||  || — || August 16, 2001 || Socorro || LINEAR || — || align=right | 6.8 km || 
|-id=183 bgcolor=#d6d6d6
| 57183 ||  || — || August 16, 2001 || Socorro || LINEAR || — || align=right | 8.0 km || 
|-id=184 bgcolor=#E9E9E9
| 57184 ||  || — || August 16, 2001 || Socorro || LINEAR || — || align=right | 6.5 km || 
|-id=185 bgcolor=#E9E9E9
| 57185 ||  || — || August 16, 2001 || Socorro || LINEAR || — || align=right | 6.6 km || 
|-id=186 bgcolor=#fefefe
| 57186 ||  || — || August 16, 2001 || Socorro || LINEAR || V || align=right | 2.5 km || 
|-id=187 bgcolor=#E9E9E9
| 57187 ||  || — || August 16, 2001 || Socorro || LINEAR || HEN || align=right | 3.5 km || 
|-id=188 bgcolor=#fefefe
| 57188 ||  || — || August 16, 2001 || Socorro || LINEAR || V || align=right | 2.7 km || 
|-id=189 bgcolor=#E9E9E9
| 57189 ||  || — || August 16, 2001 || Socorro || LINEAR || MRX || align=right | 3.7 km || 
|-id=190 bgcolor=#E9E9E9
| 57190 ||  || — || August 16, 2001 || Socorro || LINEAR || — || align=right | 4.9 km || 
|-id=191 bgcolor=#d6d6d6
| 57191 ||  || — || August 16, 2001 || Socorro || LINEAR || — || align=right | 7.8 km || 
|-id=192 bgcolor=#fefefe
| 57192 ||  || — || August 16, 2001 || Socorro || LINEAR || — || align=right | 1.8 km || 
|-id=193 bgcolor=#fefefe
| 57193 ||  || — || August 19, 2001 || Reedy Creek || J. Broughton || EUT || align=right | 1.5 km || 
|-id=194 bgcolor=#fefefe
| 57194 ||  || — || August 16, 2001 || Socorro || LINEAR || NYS || align=right | 1.7 km || 
|-id=195 bgcolor=#E9E9E9
| 57195 ||  || — || August 16, 2001 || Socorro || LINEAR || — || align=right | 2.6 km || 
|-id=196 bgcolor=#E9E9E9
| 57196 ||  || — || August 16, 2001 || Socorro || LINEAR || — || align=right | 2.4 km || 
|-id=197 bgcolor=#E9E9E9
| 57197 ||  || — || August 16, 2001 || Socorro || LINEAR || — || align=right | 4.6 km || 
|-id=198 bgcolor=#d6d6d6
| 57198 ||  || — || August 16, 2001 || Socorro || LINEAR || — || align=right | 7.8 km || 
|-id=199 bgcolor=#fefefe
| 57199 ||  || — || August 16, 2001 || Socorro || LINEAR || V || align=right | 2.0 km || 
|-id=200 bgcolor=#E9E9E9
| 57200 ||  || — || August 16, 2001 || Socorro || LINEAR || — || align=right | 3.5 km || 
|}

57201–57300 

|-bgcolor=#E9E9E9
| 57201 ||  || — || August 16, 2001 || Socorro || LINEAR || — || align=right | 3.1 km || 
|-id=202 bgcolor=#fefefe
| 57202 ||  || — || August 16, 2001 || Socorro || LINEAR || moon || align=right | 2.3 km || 
|-id=203 bgcolor=#fefefe
| 57203 ||  || — || August 16, 2001 || Socorro || LINEAR || — || align=right | 2.0 km || 
|-id=204 bgcolor=#d6d6d6
| 57204 ||  || — || August 16, 2001 || Socorro || LINEAR || — || align=right | 5.8 km || 
|-id=205 bgcolor=#fefefe
| 57205 ||  || — || August 16, 2001 || Socorro || LINEAR || V || align=right | 1.5 km || 
|-id=206 bgcolor=#fefefe
| 57206 ||  || — || August 16, 2001 || Socorro || LINEAR || — || align=right | 1.6 km || 
|-id=207 bgcolor=#fefefe
| 57207 ||  || — || August 16, 2001 || Socorro || LINEAR || — || align=right | 1.7 km || 
|-id=208 bgcolor=#E9E9E9
| 57208 ||  || — || August 16, 2001 || Socorro || LINEAR || AEO || align=right | 4.8 km || 
|-id=209 bgcolor=#E9E9E9
| 57209 ||  || — || August 17, 2001 || Socorro || LINEAR || — || align=right | 6.5 km || 
|-id=210 bgcolor=#fefefe
| 57210 ||  || — || August 17, 2001 || Socorro || LINEAR || V || align=right | 1.9 km || 
|-id=211 bgcolor=#fefefe
| 57211 ||  || — || August 18, 2001 || Socorro || LINEAR || FLO || align=right | 2.0 km || 
|-id=212 bgcolor=#d6d6d6
| 57212 ||  || — || August 18, 2001 || Socorro || LINEAR || — || align=right | 6.1 km || 
|-id=213 bgcolor=#fefefe
| 57213 ||  || — || August 18, 2001 || Socorro || LINEAR || — || align=right | 1.6 km || 
|-id=214 bgcolor=#d6d6d6
| 57214 ||  || — || August 16, 2001 || Socorro || LINEAR || MEL || align=right | 6.8 km || 
|-id=215 bgcolor=#fefefe
| 57215 ||  || — || August 16, 2001 || Socorro || LINEAR || — || align=right | 2.1 km || 
|-id=216 bgcolor=#fefefe
| 57216 ||  || — || August 16, 2001 || Socorro || LINEAR || V || align=right | 1.8 km || 
|-id=217 bgcolor=#fefefe
| 57217 ||  || — || August 17, 2001 || Socorro || LINEAR || FLO || align=right | 2.1 km || 
|-id=218 bgcolor=#fefefe
| 57218 ||  || — || August 17, 2001 || Socorro || LINEAR || V || align=right | 1.8 km || 
|-id=219 bgcolor=#E9E9E9
| 57219 ||  || — || August 20, 2001 || Oakley || C. Wolfe || — || align=right | 5.1 km || 
|-id=220 bgcolor=#E9E9E9
| 57220 ||  || — || August 21, 2001 || Desert Eagle || W. K. Y. Yeung || — || align=right | 6.6 km || 
|-id=221 bgcolor=#E9E9E9
| 57221 ||  || — || August 16, 2001 || Socorro || LINEAR || — || align=right | 2.5 km || 
|-id=222 bgcolor=#fefefe
| 57222 ||  || — || August 16, 2001 || Socorro || LINEAR || — || align=right | 2.3 km || 
|-id=223 bgcolor=#d6d6d6
| 57223 ||  || — || August 16, 2001 || Socorro || LINEAR || — || align=right | 9.6 km || 
|-id=224 bgcolor=#fefefe
| 57224 ||  || — || August 16, 2001 || Socorro || LINEAR || — || align=right | 2.5 km || 
|-id=225 bgcolor=#E9E9E9
| 57225 ||  || — || August 16, 2001 || Socorro || LINEAR || — || align=right | 3.0 km || 
|-id=226 bgcolor=#E9E9E9
| 57226 ||  || — || August 16, 2001 || Socorro || LINEAR || — || align=right | 5.4 km || 
|-id=227 bgcolor=#E9E9E9
| 57227 ||  || — || August 16, 2001 || Socorro || LINEAR || — || align=right | 5.1 km || 
|-id=228 bgcolor=#E9E9E9
| 57228 ||  || — || August 16, 2001 || Socorro || LINEAR || EUN || align=right | 4.9 km || 
|-id=229 bgcolor=#d6d6d6
| 57229 ||  || — || August 16, 2001 || Socorro || LINEAR || — || align=right | 8.8 km || 
|-id=230 bgcolor=#E9E9E9
| 57230 ||  || — || August 16, 2001 || Socorro || LINEAR || — || align=right | 3.3 km || 
|-id=231 bgcolor=#E9E9E9
| 57231 ||  || — || August 16, 2001 || Socorro || LINEAR || — || align=right | 8.9 km || 
|-id=232 bgcolor=#E9E9E9
| 57232 ||  || — || August 16, 2001 || Socorro || LINEAR || — || align=right | 5.8 km || 
|-id=233 bgcolor=#fefefe
| 57233 ||  || — || August 16, 2001 || Socorro || LINEAR || — || align=right | 3.0 km || 
|-id=234 bgcolor=#E9E9E9
| 57234 ||  || — || August 16, 2001 || Socorro || LINEAR || — || align=right | 2.8 km || 
|-id=235 bgcolor=#E9E9E9
| 57235 ||  || — || August 16, 2001 || Socorro || LINEAR || — || align=right | 5.6 km || 
|-id=236 bgcolor=#E9E9E9
| 57236 ||  || — || August 16, 2001 || Socorro || LINEAR || — || align=right | 11 km || 
|-id=237 bgcolor=#E9E9E9
| 57237 ||  || — || August 16, 2001 || Socorro || LINEAR || — || align=right | 5.9 km || 
|-id=238 bgcolor=#fefefe
| 57238 ||  || — || August 17, 2001 || Socorro || LINEAR || — || align=right | 2.2 km || 
|-id=239 bgcolor=#fefefe
| 57239 ||  || — || August 17, 2001 || Socorro || LINEAR || V || align=right | 1.7 km || 
|-id=240 bgcolor=#fefefe
| 57240 ||  || — || August 17, 2001 || Socorro || LINEAR || FLO || align=right | 2.1 km || 
|-id=241 bgcolor=#fefefe
| 57241 ||  || — || August 17, 2001 || Socorro || LINEAR || — || align=right | 1.9 km || 
|-id=242 bgcolor=#E9E9E9
| 57242 ||  || — || August 17, 2001 || Socorro || LINEAR || — || align=right | 3.2 km || 
|-id=243 bgcolor=#E9E9E9
| 57243 ||  || — || August 17, 2001 || Socorro || LINEAR || MAR || align=right | 3.4 km || 
|-id=244 bgcolor=#fefefe
| 57244 ||  || — || August 18, 2001 || Socorro || LINEAR || — || align=right | 1.6 km || 
|-id=245 bgcolor=#d6d6d6
| 57245 ||  || — || August 18, 2001 || Socorro || LINEAR || — || align=right | 6.9 km || 
|-id=246 bgcolor=#fefefe
| 57246 ||  || — || August 19, 2001 || Socorro || LINEAR || FLO || align=right | 1.8 km || 
|-id=247 bgcolor=#d6d6d6
| 57247 ||  || — || August 18, 2001 || Palomar || NEAT || — || align=right | 8.2 km || 
|-id=248 bgcolor=#E9E9E9
| 57248 ||  || — || August 19, 2001 || Socorro || LINEAR || BAR || align=right | 3.0 km || 
|-id=249 bgcolor=#d6d6d6
| 57249 ||  || — || August 22, 2001 || Socorro || LINEAR || BRA || align=right | 6.3 km || 
|-id=250 bgcolor=#fefefe
| 57250 ||  || — || August 23, 2001 || Desert Eagle || W. K. Y. Yeung || — || align=right | 4.4 km || 
|-id=251 bgcolor=#E9E9E9
| 57251 ||  || — || August 16, 2001 || Socorro || LINEAR || RAF || align=right | 2.6 km || 
|-id=252 bgcolor=#E9E9E9
| 57252 ||  || — || August 16, 2001 || Socorro || LINEAR || EUN || align=right | 6.3 km || 
|-id=253 bgcolor=#d6d6d6
| 57253 ||  || — || August 19, 2001 || Socorro || LINEAR || EUP || align=right | 10 km || 
|-id=254 bgcolor=#E9E9E9
| 57254 ||  || — || August 19, 2001 || Socorro || LINEAR || — || align=right | 3.2 km || 
|-id=255 bgcolor=#fefefe
| 57255 ||  || — || August 19, 2001 || Socorro || LINEAR || FLO || align=right | 3.8 km || 
|-id=256 bgcolor=#E9E9E9
| 57256 ||  || — || August 20, 2001 || Socorro || LINEAR || — || align=right | 3.1 km || 
|-id=257 bgcolor=#E9E9E9
| 57257 ||  || — || August 20, 2001 || Socorro || LINEAR || — || align=right | 2.8 km || 
|-id=258 bgcolor=#E9E9E9
| 57258 ||  || — || August 22, 2001 || Socorro || LINEAR || — || align=right | 2.6 km || 
|-id=259 bgcolor=#d6d6d6
| 57259 ||  || — || August 23, 2001 || Socorro || LINEAR || 628 || align=right | 4.5 km || 
|-id=260 bgcolor=#E9E9E9
| 57260 ||  || — || August 18, 2001 || Anderson Mesa || LONEOS || — || align=right | 5.3 km || 
|-id=261 bgcolor=#fefefe
| 57261 ||  || — || August 23, 2001 || Anderson Mesa || LONEOS || V || align=right | 1.3 km || 
|-id=262 bgcolor=#fefefe
| 57262 ||  || — || August 21, 2001 || Socorro || LINEAR || — || align=right | 3.0 km || 
|-id=263 bgcolor=#d6d6d6
| 57263 ||  || — || August 20, 2001 || Haleakala || NEAT || — || align=right | 6.2 km || 
|-id=264 bgcolor=#d6d6d6
| 57264 ||  || — || August 23, 2001 || Desert Eagle || W. K. Y. Yeung || — || align=right | 9.3 km || 
|-id=265 bgcolor=#fefefe
| 57265 ||  || — || August 18, 2001 || Socorro || LINEAR || NYS || align=right | 1.9 km || 
|-id=266 bgcolor=#fefefe
| 57266 ||  || — || August 19, 2001 || Socorro || LINEAR || FLO || align=right | 3.4 km || 
|-id=267 bgcolor=#E9E9E9
| 57267 ||  || — || August 19, 2001 || Socorro || LINEAR || — || align=right | 2.4 km || 
|-id=268 bgcolor=#fefefe
| 57268 ||  || — || August 19, 2001 || Socorro || LINEAR || — || align=right | 1.8 km || 
|-id=269 bgcolor=#E9E9E9
| 57269 ||  || — || August 20, 2001 || Socorro || LINEAR || HNS || align=right | 3.6 km || 
|-id=270 bgcolor=#E9E9E9
| 57270 ||  || — || August 22, 2001 || Socorro || LINEAR || GEF || align=right | 2.6 km || 
|-id=271 bgcolor=#d6d6d6
| 57271 ||  || — || August 22, 2001 || Socorro || LINEAR || EOS || align=right | 5.5 km || 
|-id=272 bgcolor=#d6d6d6
| 57272 ||  || — || August 22, 2001 || Socorro || LINEAR || EUP || align=right | 8.5 km || 
|-id=273 bgcolor=#E9E9E9
| 57273 ||  || — || August 22, 2001 || Socorro || LINEAR || — || align=right | 5.9 km || 
|-id=274 bgcolor=#fefefe
| 57274 ||  || — || August 22, 2001 || Socorro || LINEAR || V || align=right | 1.9 km || 
|-id=275 bgcolor=#E9E9E9
| 57275 ||  || — || August 22, 2001 || Socorro || LINEAR || — || align=right | 3.7 km || 
|-id=276 bgcolor=#d6d6d6
| 57276 ||  || — || August 22, 2001 || Socorro || LINEAR || 629 || align=right | 7.2 km || 
|-id=277 bgcolor=#E9E9E9
| 57277 ||  || — || August 22, 2001 || Socorro || LINEAR || GEF || align=right | 3.6 km || 
|-id=278 bgcolor=#fefefe
| 57278 ||  || — || August 23, 2001 || Socorro || LINEAR || — || align=right | 2.5 km || 
|-id=279 bgcolor=#E9E9E9
| 57279 ||  || — || August 20, 2001 || Palomar || NEAT || — || align=right | 4.4 km || 
|-id=280 bgcolor=#fefefe
| 57280 ||  || — || August 20, 2001 || Haleakala || NEAT || — || align=right | 1.4 km || 
|-id=281 bgcolor=#E9E9E9
| 57281 ||  || — || August 20, 2001 || Haleakala || NEAT || RAF || align=right | 2.8 km || 
|-id=282 bgcolor=#fefefe
| 57282 ||  || — || August 23, 2001 || Anderson Mesa || LONEOS || — || align=right | 1.9 km || 
|-id=283 bgcolor=#fefefe
| 57283 ||  || — || August 23, 2001 || Anderson Mesa || LONEOS || FLO || align=right | 2.7 km || 
|-id=284 bgcolor=#fefefe
| 57284 ||  || — || August 23, 2001 || Anderson Mesa || LONEOS || — || align=right | 4.2 km || 
|-id=285 bgcolor=#E9E9E9
| 57285 ||  || — || August 23, 2001 || Anderson Mesa || LONEOS || — || align=right | 5.5 km || 
|-id=286 bgcolor=#fefefe
| 57286 ||  || — || August 23, 2001 || Anderson Mesa || LONEOS || V || align=right | 1.3 km || 
|-id=287 bgcolor=#E9E9E9
| 57287 ||  || — || August 23, 2001 || Anderson Mesa || LONEOS || — || align=right | 2.2 km || 
|-id=288 bgcolor=#d6d6d6
| 57288 ||  || — || August 31, 2001 || Desert Eagle || W. K. Y. Yeung || EOS || align=right | 12 km || 
|-id=289 bgcolor=#fefefe
| 57289 ||  || — || August 24, 2001 || Haleakala || NEAT || V || align=right | 1.5 km || 
|-id=290 bgcolor=#d6d6d6
| 57290 ||  || — || August 19, 2001 || Anderson Mesa || LONEOS || — || align=right | 13 km || 
|-id=291 bgcolor=#d6d6d6
| 57291 ||  || — || August 25, 2001 || Socorro || LINEAR || — || align=right | 8.7 km || 
|-id=292 bgcolor=#d6d6d6
| 57292 ||  || — || August 21, 2001 || Oakley || C. Wolfe || — || align=right | 8.9 km || 
|-id=293 bgcolor=#fefefe
| 57293 ||  || — || August 27, 2001 || Palomar || NEAT || V || align=right | 2.0 km || 
|-id=294 bgcolor=#fefefe
| 57294 ||  || — || August 27, 2001 || Palomar || NEAT || — || align=right | 2.9 km || 
|-id=295 bgcolor=#d6d6d6
| 57295 ||  || — || August 28, 2001 || Palomar || NEAT || — || align=right | 6.7 km || 
|-id=296 bgcolor=#E9E9E9
| 57296 ||  || — || August 21, 2001 || Haleakala || NEAT || — || align=right | 3.5 km || 
|-id=297 bgcolor=#E9E9E9
| 57297 ||  || — || August 21, 2001 || Haleakala || NEAT || — || align=right | 5.8 km || 
|-id=298 bgcolor=#E9E9E9
| 57298 ||  || — || August 22, 2001 || Socorro || LINEAR || — || align=right | 3.2 km || 
|-id=299 bgcolor=#E9E9E9
| 57299 ||  || — || August 22, 2001 || Socorro || LINEAR || — || align=right | 5.6 km || 
|-id=300 bgcolor=#E9E9E9
| 57300 ||  || — || August 22, 2001 || Kitt Peak || Spacewatch || — || align=right | 1.9 km || 
|}

57301–57400 

|-bgcolor=#fefefe
| 57301 ||  || — || August 22, 2001 || Socorro || LINEAR || V || align=right | 2.1 km || 
|-id=302 bgcolor=#E9E9E9
| 57302 ||  || — || August 22, 2001 || Socorro || LINEAR || — || align=right | 5.4 km || 
|-id=303 bgcolor=#d6d6d6
| 57303 ||  || — || August 22, 2001 || Socorro || LINEAR || — || align=right | 8.6 km || 
|-id=304 bgcolor=#d6d6d6
| 57304 ||  || — || August 22, 2001 || Socorro || LINEAR || — || align=right | 8.6 km || 
|-id=305 bgcolor=#d6d6d6
| 57305 ||  || — || August 22, 2001 || Socorro || LINEAR || — || align=right | 6.8 km || 
|-id=306 bgcolor=#E9E9E9
| 57306 ||  || — || August 22, 2001 || Socorro || LINEAR || — || align=right | 5.4 km || 
|-id=307 bgcolor=#d6d6d6
| 57307 ||  || — || August 22, 2001 || Socorro || LINEAR || EOS || align=right | 5.0 km || 
|-id=308 bgcolor=#fefefe
| 57308 ||  || — || August 22, 2001 || Kitt Peak || Spacewatch || PHO || align=right | 4.3 km || 
|-id=309 bgcolor=#E9E9E9
| 57309 ||  || — || August 23, 2001 || Anderson Mesa || LONEOS || — || align=right | 2.1 km || 
|-id=310 bgcolor=#E9E9E9
| 57310 ||  || — || August 23, 2001 || Anderson Mesa || LONEOS || — || align=right | 1.9 km || 
|-id=311 bgcolor=#fefefe
| 57311 ||  || — || August 23, 2001 || Anderson Mesa || LONEOS || — || align=right | 2.0 km || 
|-id=312 bgcolor=#fefefe
| 57312 ||  || — || August 23, 2001 || Anderson Mesa || LONEOS || — || align=right | 2.1 km || 
|-id=313 bgcolor=#fefefe
| 57313 ||  || — || August 23, 2001 || Kitt Peak || Spacewatch || V || align=right | 1.1 km || 
|-id=314 bgcolor=#E9E9E9
| 57314 ||  || — || August 24, 2001 || Anderson Mesa || LONEOS || — || align=right | 6.6 km || 
|-id=315 bgcolor=#fefefe
| 57315 ||  || — || August 24, 2001 || Socorro || LINEAR || — || align=right | 1.7 km || 
|-id=316 bgcolor=#d6d6d6
| 57316 ||  || — || August 24, 2001 || Socorro || LINEAR || — || align=right | 7.1 km || 
|-id=317 bgcolor=#fefefe
| 57317 ||  || — || August 24, 2001 || Socorro || LINEAR || MAS || align=right | 1.9 km || 
|-id=318 bgcolor=#fefefe
| 57318 ||  || — || August 24, 2001 || Socorro || LINEAR || NYS || align=right | 1.8 km || 
|-id=319 bgcolor=#E9E9E9
| 57319 ||  || — || August 24, 2001 || Socorro || LINEAR || EUN || align=right | 2.6 km || 
|-id=320 bgcolor=#fefefe
| 57320 ||  || — || August 24, 2001 || Socorro || LINEAR || NYS || align=right | 2.1 km || 
|-id=321 bgcolor=#fefefe
| 57321 ||  || — || August 24, 2001 || Desert Eagle || W. K. Y. Yeung || V || align=right | 2.3 km || 
|-id=322 bgcolor=#E9E9E9
| 57322 ||  || — || August 24, 2001 || Socorro || LINEAR || RAF || align=right | 2.3 km || 
|-id=323 bgcolor=#E9E9E9
| 57323 ||  || — || August 24, 2001 || Socorro || LINEAR || — || align=right | 9.5 km || 
|-id=324 bgcolor=#E9E9E9
| 57324 ||  || — || August 24, 2001 || Socorro || LINEAR || — || align=right | 2.7 km || 
|-id=325 bgcolor=#fefefe
| 57325 ||  || — || August 24, 2001 || Socorro || LINEAR || — || align=right | 4.2 km || 
|-id=326 bgcolor=#fefefe
| 57326 ||  || — || August 24, 2001 || Socorro || LINEAR || FLO || align=right | 1.8 km || 
|-id=327 bgcolor=#fefefe
| 57327 ||  || — || August 24, 2001 || Socorro || LINEAR || — || align=right | 1.4 km || 
|-id=328 bgcolor=#fefefe
| 57328 ||  || — || August 24, 2001 || Socorro || LINEAR || — || align=right | 1.7 km || 
|-id=329 bgcolor=#E9E9E9
| 57329 ||  || — || August 24, 2001 || Socorro || LINEAR || — || align=right | 3.5 km || 
|-id=330 bgcolor=#E9E9E9
| 57330 ||  || — || August 24, 2001 || Socorro || LINEAR || MAR || align=right | 3.5 km || 
|-id=331 bgcolor=#d6d6d6
| 57331 ||  || — || August 24, 2001 || Socorro || LINEAR || EUP || align=right | 6.7 km || 
|-id=332 bgcolor=#E9E9E9
| 57332 ||  || — || August 24, 2001 || Socorro || LINEAR || — || align=right | 3.9 km || 
|-id=333 bgcolor=#E9E9E9
| 57333 ||  || — || August 24, 2001 || Goodricke-Pigott || R. A. Tucker || — || align=right | 6.4 km || 
|-id=334 bgcolor=#E9E9E9
| 57334 ||  || — || August 25, 2001 || Socorro || LINEAR || — || align=right | 2.6 km || 
|-id=335 bgcolor=#E9E9E9
| 57335 ||  || — || August 25, 2001 || Anderson Mesa || LONEOS || ADE || align=right | 6.2 km || 
|-id=336 bgcolor=#fefefe
| 57336 ||  || — || August 25, 2001 || Socorro || LINEAR || V || align=right | 1.4 km || 
|-id=337 bgcolor=#fefefe
| 57337 ||  || — || August 25, 2001 || Socorro || LINEAR || V || align=right | 2.1 km || 
|-id=338 bgcolor=#E9E9E9
| 57338 ||  || — || August 25, 2001 || Socorro || LINEAR || — || align=right | 4.0 km || 
|-id=339 bgcolor=#fefefe
| 57339 ||  || — || August 25, 2001 || Socorro || LINEAR || — || align=right | 1.8 km || 
|-id=340 bgcolor=#E9E9E9
| 57340 ||  || — || August 25, 2001 || Socorro || LINEAR || — || align=right | 2.9 km || 
|-id=341 bgcolor=#d6d6d6
| 57341 ||  || — || August 25, 2001 || Socorro || LINEAR || THB || align=right | 9.5 km || 
|-id=342 bgcolor=#fefefe
| 57342 ||  || — || August 25, 2001 || Socorro || LINEAR || — || align=right | 2.3 km || 
|-id=343 bgcolor=#E9E9E9
| 57343 ||  || — || August 20, 2001 || Haleakala || NEAT || — || align=right | 4.5 km || 
|-id=344 bgcolor=#E9E9E9
| 57344 ||  || — || August 20, 2001 || Haleakala || NEAT || HEN || align=right | 5.0 km || 
|-id=345 bgcolor=#fefefe
| 57345 ||  || — || August 19, 2001 || Socorro || LINEAR || — || align=right | 1.5 km || 
|-id=346 bgcolor=#fefefe
| 57346 ||  || — || August 19, 2001 || Socorro || LINEAR || V || align=right | 1.8 km || 
|-id=347 bgcolor=#d6d6d6
| 57347 ||  || — || August 19, 2001 || Socorro || LINEAR || NAE || align=right | 7.9 km || 
|-id=348 bgcolor=#E9E9E9
| 57348 ||  || — || August 19, 2001 || Anderson Mesa || LONEOS || — || align=right | 5.7 km || 
|-id=349 bgcolor=#E9E9E9
| 57349 ||  || — || August 19, 2001 || Socorro || LINEAR || EUN || align=right | 3.8 km || 
|-id=350 bgcolor=#E9E9E9
| 57350 ||  || — || August 23, 2001 || Haleakala || NEAT || — || align=right | 3.8 km || 
|-id=351 bgcolor=#fefefe
| 57351 ||  || — || August 17, 2001 || Socorro || LINEAR || V || align=right | 1.4 km || 
|-id=352 bgcolor=#fefefe
| 57352 ||  || — || August 17, 2001 || Socorro || LINEAR || V || align=right | 2.1 km || 
|-id=353 bgcolor=#d6d6d6
| 57353 ||  || — || August 17, 2001 || Palomar || NEAT || — || align=right | 9.6 km || 
|-id=354 bgcolor=#E9E9E9
| 57354 ||  || — || August 16, 2001 || Socorro || LINEAR || — || align=right | 2.5 km || 
|-id=355 bgcolor=#E9E9E9
| 57355 ||  || — || August 16, 2001 || Socorro || LINEAR || — || align=right | 3.5 km || 
|-id=356 bgcolor=#fefefe
| 57356 ||  || — || August 26, 2001 || Socorro || LINEAR || PHO || align=right | 5.6 km || 
|-id=357 bgcolor=#E9E9E9
| 57357 ||  || — || August 24, 2001 || Socorro || LINEAR || — || align=right | 3.0 km || 
|-id=358 bgcolor=#fefefe
| 57358 ||  || — || August 24, 2001 || Socorro || LINEAR || — || align=right | 2.3 km || 
|-id=359 bgcolor=#E9E9E9
| 57359 Robcrawford || 2001 RC ||  || September 1, 2001 || Fountain Hills || C. W. Juels || HNS || align=right | 5.5 km || 
|-id=360 bgcolor=#fefefe
| 57360 ||  || — || September 8, 2001 || Socorro || LINEAR || — || align=right | 2.5 km || 
|-id=361 bgcolor=#E9E9E9
| 57361 ||  || — || September 11, 2001 || Desert Eagle || W. K. Y. Yeung || — || align=right | 5.5 km || 
|-id=362 bgcolor=#fefefe
| 57362 ||  || — || September 7, 2001 || Socorro || LINEAR || — || align=right | 2.3 km || 
|-id=363 bgcolor=#fefefe
| 57363 ||  || — || September 7, 2001 || Socorro || LINEAR || — || align=right | 2.0 km || 
|-id=364 bgcolor=#fefefe
| 57364 ||  || — || September 7, 2001 || Socorro || LINEAR || MAS || align=right | 1.5 km || 
|-id=365 bgcolor=#fefefe
| 57365 ||  || — || September 8, 2001 || Socorro || LINEAR || — || align=right | 2.1 km || 
|-id=366 bgcolor=#fefefe
| 57366 ||  || — || September 8, 2001 || Socorro || LINEAR || V || align=right | 1.4 km || 
|-id=367 bgcolor=#d6d6d6
| 57367 ||  || — || September 13, 2001 || Ametlla de Mar || J. Nomen || — || align=right | 6.5 km || 
|-id=368 bgcolor=#d6d6d6
| 57368 ||  || — || September 12, 2001 || Palomar || NEAT || THB || align=right | 10 km || 
|-id=369 bgcolor=#d6d6d6
| 57369 ||  || — || September 14, 2001 || Palomar || NEAT || — || align=right | 6.4 km || 
|-id=370 bgcolor=#E9E9E9
| 57370 ||  || — || September 14, 2001 || Palomar || NEAT || — || align=right | 5.4 km || 
|-id=371 bgcolor=#E9E9E9
| 57371 ||  || — || September 10, 2001 || Desert Eagle || W. K. Y. Yeung || WIT || align=right | 5.3 km || 
|-id=372 bgcolor=#fefefe
| 57372 ||  || — || September 11, 2001 || Desert Eagle || W. K. Y. Yeung || — || align=right | 2.0 km || 
|-id=373 bgcolor=#E9E9E9
| 57373 ||  || — || September 12, 2001 || Socorro || LINEAR || — || align=right | 2.5 km || 
|-id=374 bgcolor=#d6d6d6
| 57374 ||  || — || September 12, 2001 || Socorro || LINEAR || — || align=right | 7.3 km || 
|-id=375 bgcolor=#fefefe
| 57375 ||  || — || September 12, 2001 || Socorro || LINEAR || V || align=right | 1.5 km || 
|-id=376 bgcolor=#E9E9E9
| 57376 ||  || — || September 10, 2001 || Socorro || LINEAR || RAF || align=right | 5.4 km || 
|-id=377 bgcolor=#fefefe
| 57377 ||  || — || September 10, 2001 || Socorro || LINEAR || FLO || align=right | 1.7 km || 
|-id=378 bgcolor=#E9E9E9
| 57378 ||  || — || September 10, 2001 || Socorro || LINEAR || — || align=right | 5.0 km || 
|-id=379 bgcolor=#fefefe
| 57379 ||  || — || September 10, 2001 || Socorro || LINEAR || V || align=right | 2.1 km || 
|-id=380 bgcolor=#fefefe
| 57380 ||  || — || September 10, 2001 || Socorro || LINEAR || V || align=right | 2.3 km || 
|-id=381 bgcolor=#fefefe
| 57381 ||  || — || September 10, 2001 || Socorro || LINEAR || — || align=right | 1.7 km || 
|-id=382 bgcolor=#d6d6d6
| 57382 ||  || — || September 10, 2001 || Socorro || LINEAR || EOS || align=right | 5.9 km || 
|-id=383 bgcolor=#d6d6d6
| 57383 ||  || — || September 10, 2001 || Socorro || LINEAR || — || align=right | 7.8 km || 
|-id=384 bgcolor=#fefefe
| 57384 ||  || — || September 10, 2001 || Socorro || LINEAR || V || align=right | 1.8 km || 
|-id=385 bgcolor=#d6d6d6
| 57385 ||  || — || September 10, 2001 || Socorro || LINEAR || TEL || align=right | 4.2 km || 
|-id=386 bgcolor=#d6d6d6
| 57386 ||  || — || September 10, 2001 || Socorro || LINEAR || — || align=right | 7.0 km || 
|-id=387 bgcolor=#fefefe
| 57387 ||  || — || September 10, 2001 || Socorro || LINEAR || V || align=right | 1.5 km || 
|-id=388 bgcolor=#E9E9E9
| 57388 ||  || — || September 10, 2001 || Socorro || LINEAR || — || align=right | 5.4 km || 
|-id=389 bgcolor=#fefefe
| 57389 ||  || — || September 10, 2001 || Socorro || LINEAR || NYS || align=right | 1.9 km || 
|-id=390 bgcolor=#fefefe
| 57390 ||  || — || September 10, 2001 || Socorro || LINEAR || — || align=right | 2.6 km || 
|-id=391 bgcolor=#d6d6d6
| 57391 ||  || — || September 10, 2001 || Socorro || LINEAR || — || align=right | 7.8 km || 
|-id=392 bgcolor=#E9E9E9
| 57392 ||  || — || September 10, 2001 || Socorro || LINEAR || MAR || align=right | 3.0 km || 
|-id=393 bgcolor=#E9E9E9
| 57393 ||  || — || September 10, 2001 || Socorro || LINEAR || HEN || align=right | 3.2 km || 
|-id=394 bgcolor=#fefefe
| 57394 ||  || — || September 11, 2001 || Anderson Mesa || LONEOS || — || align=right | 2.0 km || 
|-id=395 bgcolor=#fefefe
| 57395 ||  || — || September 11, 2001 || Anderson Mesa || LONEOS || — || align=right | 1.8 km || 
|-id=396 bgcolor=#fefefe
| 57396 ||  || — || September 11, 2001 || Anderson Mesa || LONEOS || V || align=right | 1.9 km || 
|-id=397 bgcolor=#E9E9E9
| 57397 ||  || — || September 11, 2001 || Anderson Mesa || LONEOS || — || align=right | 4.2 km || 
|-id=398 bgcolor=#fefefe
| 57398 ||  || — || September 11, 2001 || Anderson Mesa || LONEOS || — || align=right | 2.0 km || 
|-id=399 bgcolor=#E9E9E9
| 57399 ||  || — || September 11, 2001 || Anderson Mesa || LONEOS || — || align=right | 2.6 km || 
|-id=400 bgcolor=#fefefe
| 57400 ||  || — || September 11, 2001 || Anderson Mesa || LONEOS || SUL || align=right | 3.5 km || 
|}

57401–57500 

|-bgcolor=#E9E9E9
| 57401 ||  || — || September 11, 2001 || Anderson Mesa || LONEOS || — || align=right | 3.5 km || 
|-id=402 bgcolor=#fefefe
| 57402 ||  || — || September 11, 2001 || Anderson Mesa || LONEOS || — || align=right | 3.2 km || 
|-id=403 bgcolor=#E9E9E9
| 57403 ||  || — || September 12, 2001 || Palomar || NEAT || — || align=right | 7.8 km || 
|-id=404 bgcolor=#E9E9E9
| 57404 ||  || — || September 12, 2001 || Socorro || LINEAR || — || align=right | 2.2 km || 
|-id=405 bgcolor=#E9E9E9
| 57405 ||  || — || September 12, 2001 || Socorro || LINEAR || — || align=right | 1.9 km || 
|-id=406 bgcolor=#fefefe
| 57406 ||  || — || September 12, 2001 || Socorro || LINEAR || — || align=right | 1.4 km || 
|-id=407 bgcolor=#fefefe
| 57407 ||  || — || September 12, 2001 || Socorro || LINEAR || MAS || align=right | 1.8 km || 
|-id=408 bgcolor=#E9E9E9
| 57408 ||  || — || September 12, 2001 || Socorro || LINEAR || — || align=right | 2.0 km || 
|-id=409 bgcolor=#fefefe
| 57409 ||  || — || September 12, 2001 || Socorro || LINEAR || MAS || align=right | 1.6 km || 
|-id=410 bgcolor=#fefefe
| 57410 ||  || — || September 12, 2001 || Socorro || LINEAR || — || align=right | 1.8 km || 
|-id=411 bgcolor=#E9E9E9
| 57411 ||  || — || September 12, 2001 || Socorro || LINEAR || — || align=right | 2.3 km || 
|-id=412 bgcolor=#E9E9E9
| 57412 ||  || — || September 11, 2001 || Socorro || LINEAR || — || align=right | 5.3 km || 
|-id=413 bgcolor=#fefefe
| 57413 || 2001 SE || — || September 16, 2001 || Fountain Hills || C. W. Juels, P. R. Holvorcem || — || align=right | 1.8 km || 
|-id=414 bgcolor=#E9E9E9
| 57414 || 2001 SJ || — || September 16, 2001 || Fountain Hills || C. W. Juels, P. R. Holvorcem || RAF || align=right | 3.2 km || 
|-id=415 bgcolor=#E9E9E9
| 57415 ||  || — || September 17, 2001 || Desert Eagle || W. K. Y. Yeung || MRX || align=right | 2.9 km || 
|-id=416 bgcolor=#d6d6d6
| 57416 ||  || — || September 17, 2001 || Desert Eagle || W. K. Y. Yeung || — || align=right | 4.9 km || 
|-id=417 bgcolor=#E9E9E9
| 57417 ||  || — || September 17, 2001 || Desert Eagle || W. K. Y. Yeung || — || align=right | 2.0 km || 
|-id=418 bgcolor=#fefefe
| 57418 ||  || — || September 18, 2001 || Fountain Hills || C. W. Juels, P. R. Holvorcem || — || align=right | 2.3 km || 
|-id=419 bgcolor=#E9E9E9
| 57419 ||  || — || September 16, 2001 || Socorro || LINEAR || — || align=right | 2.5 km || 
|-id=420 bgcolor=#fefefe
| 57420 ||  || — || September 18, 2001 || Kitt Peak || Spacewatch || MAS || align=right | 1.5 km || 
|-id=421 bgcolor=#E9E9E9
| 57421 ||  || — || September 19, 2001 || Fountain Hills || C. W. Juels, P. R. Holvorcem || DOR || align=right | 6.4 km || 
|-id=422 bgcolor=#d6d6d6
| 57422 ||  || — || September 18, 2001 || Desert Eagle || W. K. Y. Yeung || KOR || align=right | 3.7 km || 
|-id=423 bgcolor=#E9E9E9
| 57423 ||  || — || September 16, 2001 || Socorro || LINEAR || HEN || align=right | 2.3 km || 
|-id=424 bgcolor=#d6d6d6
| 57424 Caelumnoctu ||  ||  || September 16, 2001 || Socorro || LINEAR || EOS || align=right | 6.9 km || 
|-id=425 bgcolor=#d6d6d6
| 57425 ||  || — || September 16, 2001 || Socorro || LINEAR || EUP || align=right | 7.5 km || 
|-id=426 bgcolor=#d6d6d6
| 57426 ||  || — || September 16, 2001 || Socorro || LINEAR || THM || align=right | 5.3 km || 
|-id=427 bgcolor=#d6d6d6
| 57427 ||  || — || September 16, 2001 || Socorro || LINEAR || — || align=right | 5.1 km || 
|-id=428 bgcolor=#d6d6d6
| 57428 ||  || — || September 16, 2001 || Socorro || LINEAR || — || align=right | 7.7 km || 
|-id=429 bgcolor=#E9E9E9
| 57429 ||  || — || September 16, 2001 || Socorro || LINEAR || AST || align=right | 7.7 km || 
|-id=430 bgcolor=#fefefe
| 57430 ||  || — || September 16, 2001 || Socorro || LINEAR || NYS || align=right | 2.6 km || 
|-id=431 bgcolor=#d6d6d6
| 57431 ||  || — || September 16, 2001 || Socorro || LINEAR || KOR || align=right | 3.9 km || 
|-id=432 bgcolor=#fefefe
| 57432 ||  || — || September 16, 2001 || Socorro || LINEAR || FLO || align=right | 2.3 km || 
|-id=433 bgcolor=#fefefe
| 57433 ||  || — || September 16, 2001 || Socorro || LINEAR || V || align=right | 1.5 km || 
|-id=434 bgcolor=#fefefe
| 57434 ||  || — || September 16, 2001 || Socorro || LINEAR || NYS || align=right | 2.6 km || 
|-id=435 bgcolor=#fefefe
| 57435 ||  || — || September 16, 2001 || Socorro || LINEAR || V || align=right | 1.7 km || 
|-id=436 bgcolor=#E9E9E9
| 57436 ||  || — || September 16, 2001 || Socorro || LINEAR || — || align=right | 2.7 km || 
|-id=437 bgcolor=#E9E9E9
| 57437 ||  || — || September 16, 2001 || Socorro || LINEAR || ADE || align=right | 4.5 km || 
|-id=438 bgcolor=#E9E9E9
| 57438 ||  || — || September 16, 2001 || Socorro || LINEAR || — || align=right | 3.2 km || 
|-id=439 bgcolor=#E9E9E9
| 57439 ||  || — || September 16, 2001 || Socorro || LINEAR || — || align=right | 2.6 km || 
|-id=440 bgcolor=#E9E9E9
| 57440 ||  || — || September 16, 2001 || Socorro || LINEAR || — || align=right | 2.8 km || 
|-id=441 bgcolor=#E9E9E9
| 57441 ||  || — || September 16, 2001 || Socorro || LINEAR || — || align=right | 2.3 km || 
|-id=442 bgcolor=#fefefe
| 57442 ||  || — || September 16, 2001 || Socorro || LINEAR || SUL || align=right | 6.3 km || 
|-id=443 bgcolor=#d6d6d6
| 57443 ||  || — || September 16, 2001 || Socorro || LINEAR || — || align=right | 6.4 km || 
|-id=444 bgcolor=#E9E9E9
| 57444 ||  || — || September 16, 2001 || Socorro || LINEAR || — || align=right | 4.8 km || 
|-id=445 bgcolor=#d6d6d6
| 57445 ||  || — || September 16, 2001 || Socorro || LINEAR || — || align=right | 6.6 km || 
|-id=446 bgcolor=#d6d6d6
| 57446 ||  || — || September 16, 2001 || Socorro || LINEAR || — || align=right | 6.0 km || 
|-id=447 bgcolor=#E9E9E9
| 57447 ||  || — || September 17, 2001 || Socorro || LINEAR || — || align=right | 4.2 km || 
|-id=448 bgcolor=#E9E9E9
| 57448 ||  || — || September 17, 2001 || Socorro || LINEAR || — || align=right | 5.4 km || 
|-id=449 bgcolor=#d6d6d6
| 57449 ||  || — || September 17, 2001 || Socorro || LINEAR || EOS || align=right | 6.0 km || 
|-id=450 bgcolor=#fefefe
| 57450 ||  || — || September 17, 2001 || Socorro || LINEAR || V || align=right | 2.5 km || 
|-id=451 bgcolor=#E9E9E9
| 57451 ||  || — || September 17, 2001 || Socorro || LINEAR || MAR || align=right | 3.2 km || 
|-id=452 bgcolor=#fefefe
| 57452 ||  || — || September 17, 2001 || Socorro || LINEAR || V || align=right | 1.6 km || 
|-id=453 bgcolor=#fefefe
| 57453 ||  || — || September 17, 2001 || Socorro || LINEAR || Vslow? || align=right | 2.1 km || 
|-id=454 bgcolor=#fefefe
| 57454 ||  || — || September 17, 2001 || Socorro || LINEAR || — || align=right | 2.1 km || 
|-id=455 bgcolor=#fefefe
| 57455 ||  || — || September 17, 2001 || Socorro || LINEAR || V || align=right | 2.0 km || 
|-id=456 bgcolor=#d6d6d6
| 57456 ||  || — || September 17, 2001 || Socorro || LINEAR || — || align=right | 7.7 km || 
|-id=457 bgcolor=#d6d6d6
| 57457 ||  || — || September 17, 2001 || Socorro || LINEAR || — || align=right | 7.6 km || 
|-id=458 bgcolor=#fefefe
| 57458 ||  || — || September 18, 2001 || Anderson Mesa || LONEOS || — || align=right | 2.7 km || 
|-id=459 bgcolor=#fefefe
| 57459 ||  || — || September 19, 2001 || Anderson Mesa || LONEOS || — || align=right | 2.9 km || 
|-id=460 bgcolor=#fefefe
| 57460 ||  || — || September 19, 2001 || Anderson Mesa || LONEOS || V || align=right | 1.5 km || 
|-id=461 bgcolor=#d6d6d6
| 57461 ||  || — || September 19, 2001 || Anderson Mesa || LONEOS || KOR || align=right | 3.6 km || 
|-id=462 bgcolor=#fefefe
| 57462 ||  || — || September 19, 2001 || Anderson Mesa || LONEOS || — || align=right | 2.5 km || 
|-id=463 bgcolor=#E9E9E9
| 57463 ||  || — || September 19, 2001 || Anderson Mesa || LONEOS || — || align=right | 4.5 km || 
|-id=464 bgcolor=#fefefe
| 57464 ||  || — || September 20, 2001 || Socorro || LINEAR || NYS || align=right | 3.2 km || 
|-id=465 bgcolor=#E9E9E9
| 57465 ||  || — || September 20, 2001 || Socorro || LINEAR || — || align=right | 5.4 km || 
|-id=466 bgcolor=#fefefe
| 57466 ||  || — || September 20, 2001 || Socorro || LINEAR || V || align=right | 2.1 km || 
|-id=467 bgcolor=#E9E9E9
| 57467 ||  || — || September 20, 2001 || Socorro || LINEAR || — || align=right | 4.9 km || 
|-id=468 bgcolor=#d6d6d6
| 57468 ||  || — || September 20, 2001 || Socorro || LINEAR || — || align=right | 8.9 km || 
|-id=469 bgcolor=#E9E9E9
| 57469 ||  || — || September 20, 2001 || Desert Eagle || W. K. Y. Yeung || — || align=right | 2.7 km || 
|-id=470 bgcolor=#fefefe
| 57470 ||  || — || September 19, 2001 || Goodricke-Pigott || R. A. Tucker || — || align=right | 1.8 km || 
|-id=471 bgcolor=#d6d6d6
| 57471 Mariemarsina ||  ||  || September 22, 2001 || Farpoint || G. Hug || HYG || align=right | 7.7 km || 
|-id=472 bgcolor=#E9E9E9
| 57472 ||  || — || September 16, 2001 || Socorro || LINEAR || — || align=right | 3.5 km || 
|-id=473 bgcolor=#fefefe
| 57473 ||  || — || September 16, 2001 || Socorro || LINEAR || SUL || align=right | 4.2 km || 
|-id=474 bgcolor=#fefefe
| 57474 ||  || — || September 16, 2001 || Socorro || LINEAR || V || align=right | 1.4 km || 
|-id=475 bgcolor=#fefefe
| 57475 ||  || — || September 16, 2001 || Socorro || LINEAR || FLO || align=right | 1.7 km || 
|-id=476 bgcolor=#fefefe
| 57476 ||  || — || September 16, 2001 || Socorro || LINEAR || — || align=right | 1.9 km || 
|-id=477 bgcolor=#d6d6d6
| 57477 ||  || — || September 17, 2001 || Socorro || LINEAR || — || align=right | 4.6 km || 
|-id=478 bgcolor=#fefefe
| 57478 ||  || — || September 17, 2001 || Socorro || LINEAR || V || align=right | 2.0 km || 
|-id=479 bgcolor=#fefefe
| 57479 ||  || — || September 17, 2001 || Socorro || LINEAR || — || align=right | 1.4 km || 
|-id=480 bgcolor=#d6d6d6
| 57480 ||  || — || September 17, 2001 || Socorro || LINEAR || KOR || align=right | 3.7 km || 
|-id=481 bgcolor=#E9E9E9
| 57481 ||  || — || September 17, 2001 || Socorro || LINEAR || — || align=right | 4.7 km || 
|-id=482 bgcolor=#E9E9E9
| 57482 ||  || — || September 17, 2001 || Socorro || LINEAR || — || align=right | 4.8 km || 
|-id=483 bgcolor=#d6d6d6
| 57483 ||  || — || September 17, 2001 || Socorro || LINEAR || KOR || align=right | 3.4 km || 
|-id=484 bgcolor=#fefefe
| 57484 ||  || — || September 17, 2001 || Socorro || LINEAR || V || align=right | 1.8 km || 
|-id=485 bgcolor=#E9E9E9
| 57485 ||  || — || September 17, 2001 || Socorro || LINEAR || — || align=right | 4.0 km || 
|-id=486 bgcolor=#fefefe
| 57486 ||  || — || September 17, 2001 || Socorro || LINEAR || — || align=right | 2.9 km || 
|-id=487 bgcolor=#fefefe
| 57487 ||  || — || September 17, 2001 || Socorro || LINEAR || V || align=right | 1.9 km || 
|-id=488 bgcolor=#E9E9E9
| 57488 ||  || — || September 17, 2001 || Socorro || LINEAR || — || align=right | 4.5 km || 
|-id=489 bgcolor=#fefefe
| 57489 ||  || — || September 16, 2001 || Socorro || LINEAR || — || align=right | 2.3 km || 
|-id=490 bgcolor=#fefefe
| 57490 ||  || — || September 16, 2001 || Socorro || LINEAR || NYS || align=right | 2.0 km || 
|-id=491 bgcolor=#E9E9E9
| 57491 ||  || — || September 16, 2001 || Socorro || LINEAR || — || align=right | 2.6 km || 
|-id=492 bgcolor=#fefefe
| 57492 ||  || — || September 19, 2001 || Socorro || LINEAR || FLO || align=right | 1.5 km || 
|-id=493 bgcolor=#fefefe
| 57493 ||  || — || September 19, 2001 || Socorro || LINEAR || NYS || align=right | 1.9 km || 
|-id=494 bgcolor=#E9E9E9
| 57494 ||  || — || September 19, 2001 || Socorro || LINEAR || — || align=right | 2.7 km || 
|-id=495 bgcolor=#E9E9E9
| 57495 ||  || — || September 19, 2001 || Socorro || LINEAR || — || align=right | 4.5 km || 
|-id=496 bgcolor=#fefefe
| 57496 ||  || — || September 19, 2001 || Socorro || LINEAR || V || align=right | 1.6 km || 
|-id=497 bgcolor=#fefefe
| 57497 ||  || — || September 19, 2001 || Socorro || LINEAR || NYS || align=right | 2.9 km || 
|-id=498 bgcolor=#fefefe
| 57498 ||  || — || September 19, 2001 || Socorro || LINEAR || — || align=right | 1.9 km || 
|-id=499 bgcolor=#E9E9E9
| 57499 ||  || — || September 19, 2001 || Socorro || LINEAR || MRX || align=right | 2.9 km || 
|-id=500 bgcolor=#E9E9E9
| 57500 ||  || — || September 19, 2001 || Socorro || LINEAR || EUN || align=right | 3.7 km || 
|}

57501–57600 

|-bgcolor=#fefefe
| 57501 ||  || — || September 19, 2001 || Socorro || LINEAR || — || align=right | 2.1 km || 
|-id=502 bgcolor=#fefefe
| 57502 ||  || — || September 19, 2001 || Socorro || LINEAR || — || align=right | 2.1 km || 
|-id=503 bgcolor=#fefefe
| 57503 ||  || — || September 19, 2001 || Socorro || LINEAR || — || align=right | 2.0 km || 
|-id=504 bgcolor=#fefefe
| 57504 ||  || — || September 25, 2001 || Desert Eagle || W. K. Y. Yeung || — || align=right | 2.0 km || 
|-id=505 bgcolor=#E9E9E9
| 57505 ||  || — || September 25, 2001 || Desert Eagle || W. K. Y. Yeung || — || align=right | 4.4 km || 
|-id=506 bgcolor=#d6d6d6
| 57506 ||  || — || September 25, 2001 || Desert Eagle || W. K. Y. Yeung || EOS || align=right | 6.1 km || 
|-id=507 bgcolor=#d6d6d6
| 57507 ||  || — || September 26, 2001 || Desert Eagle || W. K. Y. Yeung || KOR || align=right | 3.1 km || 
|-id=508 bgcolor=#E9E9E9
| 57508 ||  || — || September 27, 2001 || Fountain Hills || C. W. Juels, P. R. Holvorcem || — || align=right | 3.1 km || 
|-id=509 bgcolor=#E9E9E9
| 57509 Sly ||  ||  || September 16, 2001 || Palomar || NEAT || ADE || align=right | 5.0 km || 
|-id=510 bgcolor=#E9E9E9
| 57510 ||  || — || September 21, 2001 || Anderson Mesa || LONEOS || — || align=right | 4.1 km || 
|-id=511 bgcolor=#d6d6d6
| 57511 ||  || — || September 21, 2001 || Anderson Mesa || LONEOS || KOR || align=right | 3.4 km || 
|-id=512 bgcolor=#fefefe
| 57512 ||  || — || September 21, 2001 || Anderson Mesa || LONEOS || — || align=right | 5.0 km || 
|-id=513 bgcolor=#d6d6d6
| 57513 ||  || — || September 21, 2001 || Anderson Mesa || LONEOS || EOS || align=right | 6.6 km || 
|-id=514 bgcolor=#E9E9E9
| 57514 ||  || — || September 21, 2001 || Anderson Mesa || LONEOS || MAR || align=right | 2.7 km || 
|-id=515 bgcolor=#d6d6d6
| 57515 ||  || — || September 22, 2001 || Anderson Mesa || LONEOS || EUP || align=right | 8.7 km || 
|-id=516 bgcolor=#E9E9E9
| 57516 ||  || — || September 22, 2001 || Anderson Mesa || LONEOS || HNS || align=right | 3.7 km || 
|-id=517 bgcolor=#E9E9E9
| 57517 ||  || — || September 28, 2001 || Fountain Hills || C. W. Juels, P. R. Holvorcem || — || align=right | 2.8 km || 
|-id=518 bgcolor=#d6d6d6
| 57518 ||  || — || September 28, 2001 || Fountain Hills || C. W. Juels, P. R. Holvorcem || — || align=right | 7.9 km || 
|-id=519 bgcolor=#E9E9E9
| 57519 ||  || — || September 27, 2001 || Palomar || NEAT || — || align=right | 5.6 km || 
|-id=520 bgcolor=#E9E9E9
| 57520 ||  || — || September 22, 2001 || Goodricke-Pigott || R. A. Tucker || — || align=right | 5.2 km || 
|-id=521 bgcolor=#fefefe
| 57521 ||  || — || September 23, 2001 || Goodricke-Pigott || R. A. Tucker || FLO || align=right | 1.5 km || 
|-id=522 bgcolor=#E9E9E9
| 57522 ||  || — || September 25, 2001 || Goodricke-Pigott || R. A. Tucker || WAT || align=right | 4.8 km || 
|-id=523 bgcolor=#E9E9E9
| 57523 ||  || — || September 25, 2001 || Goodricke-Pigott || R. A. Tucker || MAR || align=right | 3.0 km || 
|-id=524 bgcolor=#E9E9E9
| 57524 ||  || — || September 17, 2001 || Anderson Mesa || LONEOS || HNS || align=right | 3.6 km || 
|-id=525 bgcolor=#E9E9E9
| 57525 ||  || — || September 25, 2001 || Socorro || LINEAR || — || align=right | 5.2 km || 
|-id=526 bgcolor=#E9E9E9
| 57526 ||  || — || September 25, 2001 || Socorro || LINEAR || — || align=right | 5.0 km || 
|-id=527 bgcolor=#E9E9E9
| 57527 ||  || — || September 25, 2001 || Socorro || LINEAR || — || align=right | 5.9 km || 
|-id=528 bgcolor=#E9E9E9
| 57528 ||  || — || September 22, 2001 || Palomar || NEAT || MAR || align=right | 2.9 km || 
|-id=529 bgcolor=#d6d6d6
| 57529 ||  || — || September 23, 2001 || Palomar || NEAT || ALA || align=right | 7.5 km || 
|-id=530 bgcolor=#d6d6d6
| 57530 ||  || — || September 23, 2001 || Anderson Mesa || LONEOS || — || align=right | 11 km || 
|-id=531 bgcolor=#d6d6d6
| 57531 ||  || — || September 25, 2001 || Socorro || LINEAR || — || align=right | 9.7 km || 
|-id=532 bgcolor=#E9E9E9
| 57532 || 2001 TA || — || October 3, 2001 || Palomar || NEAT || EUN || align=right | 5.3 km || 
|-id=533 bgcolor=#E9E9E9
| 57533 ||  || — || October 6, 2001 || Palomar || NEAT || — || align=right | 2.9 km || 
|-id=534 bgcolor=#d6d6d6
| 57534 ||  || — || October 9, 2001 || Socorro || LINEAR || — || align=right | 8.8 km || 
|-id=535 bgcolor=#fefefe
| 57535 ||  || — || October 13, 2001 || Socorro || LINEAR || — || align=right | 1.4 km || 
|-id=536 bgcolor=#d6d6d6
| 57536 ||  || — || October 11, 2001 || Socorro || LINEAR || — || align=right | 7.2 km || 
|-id=537 bgcolor=#E9E9E9
| 57537 ||  || — || October 11, 2001 || Goodricke-Pigott || R. A. Tucker || — || align=right | 3.5 km || 
|-id=538 bgcolor=#E9E9E9
| 57538 ||  || — || October 12, 2001 || Farpoint || G. Hug || MAR || align=right | 3.2 km || 
|-id=539 bgcolor=#E9E9E9
| 57539 ||  || — || October 14, 2001 || Desert Eagle || W. K. Y. Yeung || EUN || align=right | 4.4 km || 
|-id=540 bgcolor=#d6d6d6
| 57540 ||  || — || October 14, 2001 || Desert Eagle || W. K. Y. Yeung || KOR || align=right | 4.3 km || 
|-id=541 bgcolor=#E9E9E9
| 57541 ||  || — || October 11, 2001 || Goodricke-Pigott || R. A. Tucker || EUN || align=right | 4.3 km || 
|-id=542 bgcolor=#E9E9E9
| 57542 ||  || — || October 15, 2001 || Goodricke-Pigott || R. A. Tucker || — || align=right | 4.5 km || 
|-id=543 bgcolor=#E9E9E9
| 57543 ||  || — || October 9, 2001 || Socorro || LINEAR || — || align=right | 4.7 km || 
|-id=544 bgcolor=#d6d6d6
| 57544 ||  || — || October 9, 2001 || Socorro || LINEAR || 629 || align=right | 3.1 km || 
|-id=545 bgcolor=#d6d6d6
| 57545 ||  || — || October 9, 2001 || Socorro || LINEAR || — || align=right | 8.5 km || 
|-id=546 bgcolor=#fefefe
| 57546 ||  || — || October 11, 2001 || Socorro || LINEAR || — || align=right | 2.0 km || 
|-id=547 bgcolor=#E9E9E9
| 57547 ||  || — || October 11, 2001 || Socorro || LINEAR || — || align=right | 5.1 km || 
|-id=548 bgcolor=#E9E9E9
| 57548 ||  || — || October 13, 2001 || Socorro || LINEAR || — || align=right | 4.1 km || 
|-id=549 bgcolor=#E9E9E9
| 57549 ||  || — || October 14, 2001 || Socorro || LINEAR || — || align=right | 4.3 km || 
|-id=550 bgcolor=#E9E9E9
| 57550 ||  || — || October 14, 2001 || Socorro || LINEAR || — || align=right | 4.2 km || 
|-id=551 bgcolor=#E9E9E9
| 57551 ||  || — || October 14, 2001 || Socorro || LINEAR || — || align=right | 4.2 km || 
|-id=552 bgcolor=#d6d6d6
| 57552 ||  || — || October 14, 2001 || Socorro || LINEAR || — || align=right | 4.8 km || 
|-id=553 bgcolor=#fefefe
| 57553 ||  || — || October 14, 2001 || Socorro || LINEAR || NYS || align=right | 4.0 km || 
|-id=554 bgcolor=#fefefe
| 57554 ||  || — || October 14, 2001 || Socorro || LINEAR || — || align=right | 2.8 km || 
|-id=555 bgcolor=#d6d6d6
| 57555 ||  || — || October 14, 2001 || Socorro || LINEAR || EOS || align=right | 6.1 km || 
|-id=556 bgcolor=#E9E9E9
| 57556 ||  || — || October 14, 2001 || Socorro || LINEAR || — || align=right | 7.9 km || 
|-id=557 bgcolor=#fefefe
| 57557 ||  || — || October 14, 2001 || Socorro || LINEAR || — || align=right | 1.7 km || 
|-id=558 bgcolor=#d6d6d6
| 57558 ||  || — || October 9, 2001 || Kitt Peak || Spacewatch || THM || align=right | 7.3 km || 
|-id=559 bgcolor=#E9E9E9
| 57559 ||  || — || October 15, 2001 || Desert Eagle || W. K. Y. Yeung || AGN || align=right | 3.1 km || 
|-id=560 bgcolor=#d6d6d6
| 57560 ||  || — || October 15, 2001 || Desert Eagle || W. K. Y. Yeung || THM || align=right | 7.1 km || 
|-id=561 bgcolor=#fefefe
| 57561 ||  || — || October 14, 2001 || Cima Ekar || ADAS || — || align=right | 1.8 km || 
|-id=562 bgcolor=#E9E9E9
| 57562 ||  || — || October 15, 2001 || Desert Eagle || W. K. Y. Yeung || MAR || align=right | 4.2 km || 
|-id=563 bgcolor=#E9E9E9
| 57563 ||  || — || October 11, 2001 || Socorro || LINEAR || EUN || align=right | 2.9 km || 
|-id=564 bgcolor=#d6d6d6
| 57564 ||  || — || October 13, 2001 || Socorro || LINEAR || — || align=right | 8.8 km || 
|-id=565 bgcolor=#d6d6d6
| 57565 ||  || — || October 13, 2001 || Socorro || LINEAR || — || align=right | 6.6 km || 
|-id=566 bgcolor=#fefefe
| 57566 ||  || — || October 14, 2001 || Socorro || LINEAR || — || align=right | 1.8 km || 
|-id=567 bgcolor=#d6d6d6
| 57567 Crikey ||  ||  || October 14, 2001 || Needville || Needville Obs. || — || align=right | 5.5 km || 
|-id=568 bgcolor=#fefefe
| 57568 ||  || — || October 13, 2001 || Socorro || LINEAR || V || align=right | 1.6 km || 
|-id=569 bgcolor=#fefefe
| 57569 ||  || — || October 13, 2001 || Socorro || LINEAR || V || align=right | 1.7 km || 
|-id=570 bgcolor=#d6d6d6
| 57570 ||  || — || October 13, 2001 || Socorro || LINEAR || HYG || align=right | 6.7 km || 
|-id=571 bgcolor=#d6d6d6
| 57571 ||  || — || October 13, 2001 || Socorro || LINEAR || — || align=right | 6.1 km || 
|-id=572 bgcolor=#d6d6d6
| 57572 ||  || — || October 13, 2001 || Socorro || LINEAR || KOR || align=right | 3.5 km || 
|-id=573 bgcolor=#d6d6d6
| 57573 ||  || — || October 13, 2001 || Socorro || LINEAR || KOR || align=right | 3.7 km || 
|-id=574 bgcolor=#E9E9E9
| 57574 ||  || — || October 13, 2001 || Socorro || LINEAR || — || align=right | 5.0 km || 
|-id=575 bgcolor=#E9E9E9
| 57575 ||  || — || October 13, 2001 || Socorro || LINEAR || HEN || align=right | 3.5 km || 
|-id=576 bgcolor=#E9E9E9
| 57576 ||  || — || October 13, 2001 || Socorro || LINEAR || — || align=right | 2.5 km || 
|-id=577 bgcolor=#E9E9E9
| 57577 ||  || — || October 13, 2001 || Socorro || LINEAR || HOF || align=right | 6.1 km || 
|-id=578 bgcolor=#E9E9E9
| 57578 ||  || — || October 13, 2001 || Socorro || LINEAR || AGN || align=right | 3.5 km || 
|-id=579 bgcolor=#d6d6d6
| 57579 ||  || — || October 13, 2001 || Socorro || LINEAR || — || align=right | 7.1 km || 
|-id=580 bgcolor=#d6d6d6
| 57580 ||  || — || October 13, 2001 || Socorro || LINEAR || — || align=right | 6.5 km || 
|-id=581 bgcolor=#E9E9E9
| 57581 ||  || — || October 13, 2001 || Socorro || LINEAR || — || align=right | 6.9 km || 
|-id=582 bgcolor=#d6d6d6
| 57582 ||  || — || October 13, 2001 || Socorro || LINEAR || — || align=right | 7.0 km || 
|-id=583 bgcolor=#d6d6d6
| 57583 ||  || — || October 13, 2001 || Socorro || LINEAR || — || align=right | 7.1 km || 
|-id=584 bgcolor=#E9E9E9
| 57584 ||  || — || October 13, 2001 || Socorro || LINEAR || — || align=right | 3.6 km || 
|-id=585 bgcolor=#d6d6d6
| 57585 ||  || — || October 13, 2001 || Socorro || LINEAR || — || align=right | 7.9 km || 
|-id=586 bgcolor=#E9E9E9
| 57586 ||  || — || October 13, 2001 || Socorro || LINEAR || HEN || align=right | 2.2 km || 
|-id=587 bgcolor=#d6d6d6
| 57587 ||  || — || October 13, 2001 || Socorro || LINEAR || — || align=right | 5.6 km || 
|-id=588 bgcolor=#d6d6d6
| 57588 ||  || — || October 13, 2001 || Socorro || LINEAR || KOR || align=right | 3.9 km || 
|-id=589 bgcolor=#d6d6d6
| 57589 ||  || — || October 13, 2001 || Socorro || LINEAR || — || align=right | 6.1 km || 
|-id=590 bgcolor=#d6d6d6
| 57590 ||  || — || October 13, 2001 || Socorro || LINEAR || THM || align=right | 7.6 km || 
|-id=591 bgcolor=#d6d6d6
| 57591 ||  || — || October 13, 2001 || Socorro || LINEAR || — || align=right | 6.4 km || 
|-id=592 bgcolor=#E9E9E9
| 57592 ||  || — || October 13, 2001 || Socorro || LINEAR || — || align=right | 5.0 km || 
|-id=593 bgcolor=#d6d6d6
| 57593 ||  || — || October 13, 2001 || Socorro || LINEAR || — || align=right | 4.8 km || 
|-id=594 bgcolor=#E9E9E9
| 57594 ||  || — || October 13, 2001 || Socorro || LINEAR || — || align=right | 3.1 km || 
|-id=595 bgcolor=#E9E9E9
| 57595 ||  || — || October 13, 2001 || Socorro || LINEAR || EUN || align=right | 3.8 km || 
|-id=596 bgcolor=#fefefe
| 57596 ||  || — || October 14, 2001 || Socorro || LINEAR || — || align=right | 4.5 km || 
|-id=597 bgcolor=#E9E9E9
| 57597 ||  || — || October 14, 2001 || Socorro || LINEAR || — || align=right | 3.7 km || 
|-id=598 bgcolor=#E9E9E9
| 57598 ||  || — || October 14, 2001 || Socorro || LINEAR || — || align=right | 4.7 km || 
|-id=599 bgcolor=#fefefe
| 57599 ||  || — || October 14, 2001 || Socorro || LINEAR || — || align=right | 2.0 km || 
|-id=600 bgcolor=#E9E9E9
| 57600 ||  || — || October 14, 2001 || Socorro || LINEAR || — || align=right | 3.6 km || 
|}

57601–57700 

|-bgcolor=#d6d6d6
| 57601 ||  || — || October 14, 2001 || Socorro || LINEAR || EUP || align=right | 6.2 km || 
|-id=602 bgcolor=#d6d6d6
| 57602 ||  || — || October 15, 2001 || Socorro || LINEAR || — || align=right | 5.6 km || 
|-id=603 bgcolor=#E9E9E9
| 57603 ||  || — || October 15, 2001 || Socorro || LINEAR || — || align=right | 3.1 km || 
|-id=604 bgcolor=#E9E9E9
| 57604 ||  || — || October 13, 2001 || Socorro || LINEAR || — || align=right | 3.7 km || 
|-id=605 bgcolor=#E9E9E9
| 57605 ||  || — || October 13, 2001 || Socorro || LINEAR || — || align=right | 3.6 km || 
|-id=606 bgcolor=#d6d6d6
| 57606 ||  || — || October 14, 2001 || Socorro || LINEAR || — || align=right | 6.7 km || 
|-id=607 bgcolor=#fefefe
| 57607 ||  || — || October 14, 2001 || Socorro || LINEAR || — || align=right | 5.8 km || 
|-id=608 bgcolor=#fefefe
| 57608 ||  || — || October 14, 2001 || Socorro || LINEAR || — || align=right | 3.1 km || 
|-id=609 bgcolor=#E9E9E9
| 57609 ||  || — || October 14, 2001 || Socorro || LINEAR || — || align=right | 5.2 km || 
|-id=610 bgcolor=#d6d6d6
| 57610 ||  || — || October 14, 2001 || Socorro || LINEAR || — || align=right | 11 km || 
|-id=611 bgcolor=#d6d6d6
| 57611 ||  || — || October 14, 2001 || Socorro || LINEAR || — || align=right | 7.3 km || 
|-id=612 bgcolor=#E9E9E9
| 57612 ||  || — || October 14, 2001 || Socorro || LINEAR || — || align=right | 4.3 km || 
|-id=613 bgcolor=#E9E9E9
| 57613 ||  || — || October 12, 2001 || Haleakala || NEAT || — || align=right | 2.2 km || 
|-id=614 bgcolor=#d6d6d6
| 57614 ||  || — || October 12, 2001 || Haleakala || NEAT || — || align=right | 9.1 km || 
|-id=615 bgcolor=#fefefe
| 57615 ||  || — || October 12, 2001 || Haleakala || NEAT || V || align=right | 1.6 km || 
|-id=616 bgcolor=#E9E9E9
| 57616 ||  || — || October 14, 2001 || Palomar || NEAT || MAR || align=right | 3.1 km || 
|-id=617 bgcolor=#fefefe
| 57617 ||  || — || October 10, 2001 || Palomar || NEAT || V || align=right | 1.4 km || 
|-id=618 bgcolor=#E9E9E9
| 57618 ||  || — || October 10, 2001 || Palomar || NEAT || — || align=right | 2.3 km || 
|-id=619 bgcolor=#fefefe
| 57619 ||  || — || October 10, 2001 || Palomar || NEAT || — || align=right | 2.2 km || 
|-id=620 bgcolor=#E9E9E9
| 57620 ||  || — || October 10, 2001 || Palomar || NEAT || — || align=right | 3.6 km || 
|-id=621 bgcolor=#d6d6d6
| 57621 ||  || — || October 10, 2001 || Palomar || NEAT || HYG || align=right | 5.1 km || 
|-id=622 bgcolor=#E9E9E9
| 57622 ||  || — || October 10, 2001 || Palomar || NEAT || HNS || align=right | 2.3 km || 
|-id=623 bgcolor=#d6d6d6
| 57623 ||  || — || October 10, 2001 || Palomar || NEAT || — || align=right | 8.7 km || 
|-id=624 bgcolor=#d6d6d6
| 57624 ||  || — || October 10, 2001 || Palomar || NEAT || — || align=right | 6.8 km || 
|-id=625 bgcolor=#E9E9E9
| 57625 ||  || — || October 10, 2001 || Palomar || NEAT || — || align=right | 7.0 km || 
|-id=626 bgcolor=#C2FFFF
| 57626 ||  || — || October 15, 2001 || Palomar || NEAT || L5 || align=right | 19 km || 
|-id=627 bgcolor=#d6d6d6
| 57627 ||  || — || October 15, 2001 || Socorro || LINEAR || — || align=right | 6.5 km || 
|-id=628 bgcolor=#d6d6d6
| 57628 ||  || — || October 15, 2001 || Socorro || LINEAR || — || align=right | 7.9 km || 
|-id=629 bgcolor=#E9E9E9
| 57629 ||  || — || October 15, 2001 || Socorro || LINEAR || HNS || align=right | 3.9 km || 
|-id=630 bgcolor=#E9E9E9
| 57630 ||  || — || October 14, 2001 || Anderson Mesa || LONEOS || GEF || align=right | 3.3 km || 
|-id=631 bgcolor=#E9E9E9
| 57631 ||  || — || October 14, 2001 || Socorro || LINEAR || — || align=right | 3.4 km || 
|-id=632 bgcolor=#fefefe
| 57632 ||  || — || October 14, 2001 || Socorro || LINEAR || — || align=right | 1.9 km || 
|-id=633 bgcolor=#d6d6d6
| 57633 ||  || — || October 14, 2001 || Socorro || LINEAR || — || align=right | 9.0 km || 
|-id=634 bgcolor=#d6d6d6
| 57634 ||  || — || October 14, 2001 || Socorro || LINEAR || YAK || align=right | 8.3 km || 
|-id=635 bgcolor=#fefefe
| 57635 ||  || — || October 14, 2001 || Socorro || LINEAR || ERI || align=right | 3.8 km || 
|-id=636 bgcolor=#d6d6d6
| 57636 ||  || — || October 14, 2001 || Socorro || LINEAR || — || align=right | 7.5 km || 
|-id=637 bgcolor=#fefefe
| 57637 ||  || — || October 14, 2001 || Socorro || LINEAR || — || align=right | 2.7 km || 
|-id=638 bgcolor=#fefefe
| 57638 ||  || — || October 14, 2001 || Socorro || LINEAR || — || align=right | 2.4 km || 
|-id=639 bgcolor=#fefefe
| 57639 ||  || — || October 14, 2001 || Socorro || LINEAR || — || align=right | 2.3 km || 
|-id=640 bgcolor=#E9E9E9
| 57640 ||  || — || October 14, 2001 || Socorro || LINEAR || — || align=right | 3.0 km || 
|-id=641 bgcolor=#d6d6d6
| 57641 ||  || — || October 14, 2001 || Socorro || LINEAR || HYG || align=right | 6.1 km || 
|-id=642 bgcolor=#E9E9E9
| 57642 ||  || — || October 14, 2001 || Palomar || NEAT || — || align=right | 8.0 km || 
|-id=643 bgcolor=#fefefe
| 57643 ||  || — || October 11, 2001 || Socorro || LINEAR || V || align=right | 1.4 km || 
|-id=644 bgcolor=#C2FFFF
| 57644 ||  || — || October 11, 2001 || Socorro || LINEAR || L5 || align=right | 13 km || 
|-id=645 bgcolor=#E9E9E9
| 57645 ||  || — || October 11, 2001 || Socorro || LINEAR || — || align=right | 2.9 km || 
|-id=646 bgcolor=#d6d6d6
| 57646 ||  || — || October 11, 2001 || Socorro || LINEAR || — || align=right | 8.3 km || 
|-id=647 bgcolor=#E9E9E9
| 57647 ||  || — || October 11, 2001 || Socorro || LINEAR || — || align=right | 5.3 km || 
|-id=648 bgcolor=#d6d6d6
| 57648 ||  || — || October 11, 2001 || Socorro || LINEAR || — || align=right | 11 km || 
|-id=649 bgcolor=#E9E9E9
| 57649 ||  || — || October 13, 2001 || Palomar || NEAT || ADE || align=right | 7.2 km || 
|-id=650 bgcolor=#fefefe
| 57650 ||  || — || October 14, 2001 || Socorro || LINEAR || — || align=right | 4.6 km || 
|-id=651 bgcolor=#E9E9E9
| 57651 ||  || — || October 14, 2001 || Anderson Mesa || LONEOS || MRX || align=right | 3.1 km || 
|-id=652 bgcolor=#d6d6d6
| 57652 ||  || — || October 14, 2001 || Palomar || NEAT || — || align=right | 7.0 km || 
|-id=653 bgcolor=#E9E9E9
| 57653 ||  || — || October 14, 2001 || Palomar || NEAT || — || align=right | 3.8 km || 
|-id=654 bgcolor=#d6d6d6
| 57654 ||  || — || October 14, 2001 || Palomar || NEAT || — || align=right | 12 km || 
|-id=655 bgcolor=#d6d6d6
| 57655 ||  || — || October 15, 2001 || Socorro || LINEAR || TIR || align=right | 7.2 km || 
|-id=656 bgcolor=#E9E9E9
| 57656 ||  || — || October 15, 2001 || Socorro || LINEAR || EUN || align=right | 3.7 km || 
|-id=657 bgcolor=#fefefe
| 57657 ||  || — || October 15, 2001 || Palomar || NEAT || — || align=right | 2.2 km || 
|-id=658 bgcolor=#E9E9E9
| 57658 Nilrem ||  ||  || October 17, 2001 || Vicques || M. Ory || — || align=right | 3.9 km || 
|-id=659 bgcolor=#E9E9E9
| 57659 ||  || — || October 18, 2001 || Desert Eagle || W. K. Y. Yeung || — || align=right | 7.2 km || 
|-id=660 bgcolor=#d6d6d6
| 57660 ||  || — || October 18, 2001 || Desert Eagle || W. K. Y. Yeung || — || align=right | 5.9 km || 
|-id=661 bgcolor=#d6d6d6
| 57661 ||  || — || October 24, 2001 || Desert Eagle || W. K. Y. Yeung || EOS || align=right | 3.7 km || 
|-id=662 bgcolor=#d6d6d6
| 57662 ||  || — || October 24, 2001 || Desert Eagle || W. K. Y. Yeung || KOR || align=right | 3.6 km || 
|-id=663 bgcolor=#d6d6d6
| 57663 ||  || — || October 24, 2001 || Desert Eagle || W. K. Y. Yeung || EOS || align=right | 4.9 km || 
|-id=664 bgcolor=#d6d6d6
| 57664 ||  || — || October 26, 2001 || Socorro || LINEAR || — || align=right | 15 km || 
|-id=665 bgcolor=#d6d6d6
| 57665 ||  || — || October 18, 2001 || Socorro || LINEAR || EOS || align=right | 4.8 km || 
|-id=666 bgcolor=#d6d6d6
| 57666 ||  || — || October 18, 2001 || Socorro || LINEAR || EOS || align=right | 4.7 km || 
|-id=667 bgcolor=#E9E9E9
| 57667 ||  || — || October 18, 2001 || Socorro || LINEAR || GEF || align=right | 2.9 km || 
|-id=668 bgcolor=#fefefe
| 57668 ||  || — || October 18, 2001 || Palomar || NEAT || NYS || align=right | 1.5 km || 
|-id=669 bgcolor=#E9E9E9
| 57669 ||  || — || October 16, 2001 || Socorro || LINEAR || — || align=right | 4.4 km || 
|-id=670 bgcolor=#d6d6d6
| 57670 ||  || — || October 16, 2001 || Socorro || LINEAR || — || align=right | 7.4 km || 
|-id=671 bgcolor=#d6d6d6
| 57671 ||  || — || October 16, 2001 || Socorro || LINEAR || — || align=right | 7.7 km || 
|-id=672 bgcolor=#d6d6d6
| 57672 ||  || — || October 16, 2001 || Socorro || LINEAR || — || align=right | 6.7 km || 
|-id=673 bgcolor=#E9E9E9
| 57673 ||  || — || October 16, 2001 || Socorro || LINEAR || — || align=right | 3.8 km || 
|-id=674 bgcolor=#d6d6d6
| 57674 ||  || — || October 16, 2001 || Socorro || LINEAR || — || align=right | 9.4 km || 
|-id=675 bgcolor=#E9E9E9
| 57675 ||  || — || October 16, 2001 || Socorro || LINEAR || — || align=right | 4.6 km || 
|-id=676 bgcolor=#d6d6d6
| 57676 ||  || — || October 16, 2001 || Socorro || LINEAR || — || align=right | 3.5 km || 
|-id=677 bgcolor=#E9E9E9
| 57677 ||  || — || October 17, 2001 || Socorro || LINEAR || — || align=right | 2.6 km || 
|-id=678 bgcolor=#d6d6d6
| 57678 ||  || — || October 17, 2001 || Socorro || LINEAR || HYG || align=right | 5.3 km || 
|-id=679 bgcolor=#fefefe
| 57679 ||  || — || October 17, 2001 || Socorro || LINEAR || fast? || align=right | 2.1 km || 
|-id=680 bgcolor=#E9E9E9
| 57680 ||  || — || October 17, 2001 || Socorro || LINEAR || HOF || align=right | 3.8 km || 
|-id=681 bgcolor=#d6d6d6
| 57681 ||  || — || October 17, 2001 || Socorro || LINEAR || — || align=right | 5.7 km || 
|-id=682 bgcolor=#E9E9E9
| 57682 ||  || — || October 17, 2001 || Socorro || LINEAR || MAR || align=right | 4.0 km || 
|-id=683 bgcolor=#E9E9E9
| 57683 ||  || — || October 17, 2001 || Socorro || LINEAR || MIS || align=right | 7.5 km || 
|-id=684 bgcolor=#fefefe
| 57684 ||  || — || October 17, 2001 || Socorro || LINEAR || NYS || align=right | 2.8 km || 
|-id=685 bgcolor=#E9E9E9
| 57685 ||  || — || October 17, 2001 || Socorro || LINEAR || — || align=right | 4.3 km || 
|-id=686 bgcolor=#d6d6d6
| 57686 ||  || — || October 18, 2001 || Socorro || LINEAR || — || align=right | 3.9 km || 
|-id=687 bgcolor=#d6d6d6
| 57687 ||  || — || October 18, 2001 || Socorro || LINEAR || EOS || align=right | 6.3 km || 
|-id=688 bgcolor=#d6d6d6
| 57688 ||  || — || October 17, 2001 || Socorro || LINEAR || — || align=right | 5.0 km || 
|-id=689 bgcolor=#fefefe
| 57689 ||  || — || October 17, 2001 || Socorro || LINEAR || — || align=right | 2.1 km || 
|-id=690 bgcolor=#d6d6d6
| 57690 ||  || — || October 17, 2001 || Socorro || LINEAR || — || align=right | 5.5 km || 
|-id=691 bgcolor=#d6d6d6
| 57691 ||  || — || October 17, 2001 || Socorro || LINEAR || THM || align=right | 7.3 km || 
|-id=692 bgcolor=#fefefe
| 57692 ||  || — || October 17, 2001 || Socorro || LINEAR || NYS || align=right | 1.3 km || 
|-id=693 bgcolor=#d6d6d6
| 57693 ||  || — || October 17, 2001 || Socorro || LINEAR || — || align=right | 6.4 km || 
|-id=694 bgcolor=#E9E9E9
| 57694 ||  || — || October 17, 2001 || Socorro || LINEAR || — || align=right | 4.1 km || 
|-id=695 bgcolor=#d6d6d6
| 57695 ||  || — || October 17, 2001 || Socorro || LINEAR || — || align=right | 4.3 km || 
|-id=696 bgcolor=#d6d6d6
| 57696 ||  || — || October 20, 2001 || Socorro || LINEAR || — || align=right | 4.7 km || 
|-id=697 bgcolor=#d6d6d6
| 57697 ||  || — || October 20, 2001 || Socorro || LINEAR || KOR || align=right | 2.7 km || 
|-id=698 bgcolor=#fefefe
| 57698 ||  || — || October 16, 2001 || Kitt Peak || Spacewatch || NYS || align=right | 1.4 km || 
|-id=699 bgcolor=#fefefe
| 57699 ||  || — || October 16, 2001 || Palomar || NEAT || V || align=right | 1.5 km || 
|-id=700 bgcolor=#d6d6d6
| 57700 ||  || — || October 19, 2001 || Haleakala || NEAT || — || align=right | 6.3 km || 
|}

57701–57800 

|-bgcolor=#d6d6d6
| 57701 ||  || — || October 19, 2001 || Haleakala || NEAT || — || align=right | 4.6 km || 
|-id=702 bgcolor=#E9E9E9
| 57702 ||  || — || October 17, 2001 || Socorro || LINEAR || — || align=right | 2.6 km || 
|-id=703 bgcolor=#d6d6d6
| 57703 ||  || — || October 20, 2001 || Socorro || LINEAR || KOR || align=right | 3.4 km || 
|-id=704 bgcolor=#d6d6d6
| 57704 ||  || — || October 22, 2001 || Socorro || LINEAR || THM || align=right | 5.5 km || 
|-id=705 bgcolor=#fefefe
| 57705 ||  || — || October 22, 2001 || Socorro || LINEAR || V || align=right | 1.6 km || 
|-id=706 bgcolor=#E9E9E9
| 57706 ||  || — || October 22, 2001 || Socorro || LINEAR || — || align=right | 3.3 km || 
|-id=707 bgcolor=#d6d6d6
| 57707 ||  || — || October 22, 2001 || Socorro || LINEAR || KOR || align=right | 3.1 km || 
|-id=708 bgcolor=#d6d6d6
| 57708 ||  || — || October 22, 2001 || Socorro || LINEAR || THM || align=right | 7.1 km || 
|-id=709 bgcolor=#E9E9E9
| 57709 ||  || — || October 22, 2001 || Socorro || LINEAR || — || align=right | 5.1 km || 
|-id=710 bgcolor=#fefefe
| 57710 ||  || — || October 22, 2001 || Socorro || LINEAR || — || align=right | 1.9 km || 
|-id=711 bgcolor=#d6d6d6
| 57711 ||  || — || October 22, 2001 || Socorro || LINEAR || HYG || align=right | 6.0 km || 
|-id=712 bgcolor=#E9E9E9
| 57712 ||  || — || October 22, 2001 || Socorro || LINEAR || — || align=right | 3.4 km || 
|-id=713 bgcolor=#d6d6d6
| 57713 ||  || — || October 22, 2001 || Palomar || NEAT || — || align=right | 6.9 km || 
|-id=714 bgcolor=#C2FFFF
| 57714 ||  || — || October 22, 2001 || Palomar || NEAT || L5 || align=right | 28 km || 
|-id=715 bgcolor=#E9E9E9
| 57715 ||  || — || October 22, 2001 || Palomar || NEAT || — || align=right | 6.0 km || 
|-id=716 bgcolor=#d6d6d6
| 57716 ||  || — || October 17, 2001 || Socorro || LINEAR || HYG || align=right | 6.4 km || 
|-id=717 bgcolor=#E9E9E9
| 57717 ||  || — || October 17, 2001 || Socorro || LINEAR || — || align=right | 2.8 km || 
|-id=718 bgcolor=#E9E9E9
| 57718 ||  || — || October 17, 2001 || Socorro || LINEAR || — || align=right | 4.6 km || 
|-id=719 bgcolor=#d6d6d6
| 57719 ||  || — || October 20, 2001 || Socorro || LINEAR || THM || align=right | 6.4 km || 
|-id=720 bgcolor=#E9E9E9
| 57720 ||  || — || October 21, 2001 || Socorro || LINEAR || MRX || align=right | 2.8 km || 
|-id=721 bgcolor=#fefefe
| 57721 ||  || — || October 23, 2001 || Socorro || LINEAR || NYS || align=right | 1.3 km || 
|-id=722 bgcolor=#E9E9E9
| 57722 ||  || — || October 23, 2001 || Socorro || LINEAR || — || align=right | 5.3 km || 
|-id=723 bgcolor=#E9E9E9
| 57723 ||  || — || October 23, 2001 || Socorro || LINEAR || HEN || align=right | 2.5 km || 
|-id=724 bgcolor=#E9E9E9
| 57724 ||  || — || October 23, 2001 || Socorro || LINEAR || — || align=right | 3.6 km || 
|-id=725 bgcolor=#d6d6d6
| 57725 ||  || — || October 23, 2001 || Socorro || LINEAR || — || align=right | 3.4 km || 
|-id=726 bgcolor=#fefefe
| 57726 ||  || — || October 23, 2001 || Socorro || LINEAR || NYS || align=right | 2.5 km || 
|-id=727 bgcolor=#E9E9E9
| 57727 ||  || — || October 23, 2001 || Socorro || LINEAR || — || align=right | 6.1 km || 
|-id=728 bgcolor=#E9E9E9
| 57728 ||  || — || October 23, 2001 || Socorro || LINEAR || — || align=right | 4.7 km || 
|-id=729 bgcolor=#E9E9E9
| 57729 ||  || — || October 23, 2001 || Socorro || LINEAR || ADE || align=right | 5.3 km || 
|-id=730 bgcolor=#fefefe
| 57730 ||  || — || October 23, 2001 || Socorro || LINEAR || NYS || align=right | 2.0 km || 
|-id=731 bgcolor=#E9E9E9
| 57731 ||  || — || October 23, 2001 || Socorro || LINEAR || — || align=right | 4.5 km || 
|-id=732 bgcolor=#d6d6d6
| 57732 ||  || — || October 23, 2001 || Socorro || LINEAR || — || align=right | 4.5 km || 
|-id=733 bgcolor=#fefefe
| 57733 ||  || — || October 23, 2001 || Socorro || LINEAR || NYS || align=right | 2.0 km || 
|-id=734 bgcolor=#fefefe
| 57734 ||  || — || October 23, 2001 || Socorro || LINEAR || — || align=right | 2.2 km || 
|-id=735 bgcolor=#d6d6d6
| 57735 ||  || — || October 23, 2001 || Socorro || LINEAR || KAR || align=right | 3.1 km || 
|-id=736 bgcolor=#fefefe
| 57736 ||  || — || October 23, 2001 || Socorro || LINEAR || V || align=right | 1.8 km || 
|-id=737 bgcolor=#E9E9E9
| 57737 ||  || — || October 23, 2001 || Socorro || LINEAR || — || align=right | 4.5 km || 
|-id=738 bgcolor=#E9E9E9
| 57738 ||  || — || October 23, 2001 || Socorro || LINEAR || — || align=right | 2.7 km || 
|-id=739 bgcolor=#E9E9E9
| 57739 ||  || — || October 23, 2001 || Socorro || LINEAR || — || align=right | 6.4 km || 
|-id=740 bgcolor=#fefefe
| 57740 ||  || — || October 23, 2001 || Socorro || LINEAR || — || align=right | 2.6 km || 
|-id=741 bgcolor=#E9E9E9
| 57741 ||  || — || October 23, 2001 || Socorro || LINEAR || — || align=right | 4.2 km || 
|-id=742 bgcolor=#fefefe
| 57742 ||  || — || October 23, 2001 || Socorro || LINEAR || NYS || align=right | 1.8 km || 
|-id=743 bgcolor=#E9E9E9
| 57743 ||  || — || October 19, 2001 || Socorro || LINEAR || — || align=right | 4.0 km || 
|-id=744 bgcolor=#E9E9E9
| 57744 ||  || — || October 21, 2001 || Socorro || LINEAR || — || align=right | 2.8 km || 
|-id=745 bgcolor=#E9E9E9
| 57745 ||  || — || October 21, 2001 || Socorro || LINEAR || — || align=right | 2.6 km || 
|-id=746 bgcolor=#fefefe
| 57746 ||  || — || October 18, 2001 || Palomar || NEAT || FLO || align=right | 1.8 km || 
|-id=747 bgcolor=#E9E9E9
| 57747 ||  || — || October 16, 2001 || Socorro || LINEAR || — || align=right | 3.7 km || 
|-id=748 bgcolor=#fefefe
| 57748 ||  || — || October 23, 2001 || Palomar || NEAT || — || align=right | 2.9 km || 
|-id=749 bgcolor=#fefefe
| 57749 ||  || — || October 21, 2001 || Socorro || LINEAR || — || align=right | 2.6 km || 
|-id=750 bgcolor=#d6d6d6
| 57750 || 2001 VQ || — || November 7, 2001 || Socorro || LINEAR || Tj (2.99) || align=right | 9.8 km || 
|-id=751 bgcolor=#E9E9E9
| 57751 ||  || — || November 6, 2001 || Socorro || LINEAR || — || align=right | 3.4 km || 
|-id=752 bgcolor=#fefefe
| 57752 ||  || — || November 9, 2001 || Socorro || LINEAR || — || align=right | 2.7 km || 
|-id=753 bgcolor=#d6d6d6
| 57753 ||  || — || November 10, 2001 || Socorro || LINEAR || VER || align=right | 7.9 km || 
|-id=754 bgcolor=#fefefe
| 57754 ||  || — || November 10, 2001 || Socorro || LINEAR || — || align=right | 3.2 km || 
|-id=755 bgcolor=#E9E9E9
| 57755 ||  || — || November 10, 2001 || Socorro || LINEAR || — || align=right | 5.5 km || 
|-id=756 bgcolor=#d6d6d6
| 57756 ||  || — || November 7, 2001 || Palomar || NEAT || EOS || align=right | 4.9 km || 
|-id=757 bgcolor=#d6d6d6
| 57757 ||  || — || November 9, 2001 || Socorro || LINEAR || — || align=right | 4.3 km || 
|-id=758 bgcolor=#d6d6d6
| 57758 ||  || — || November 9, 2001 || Socorro || LINEAR || KOR || align=right | 3.7 km || 
|-id=759 bgcolor=#d6d6d6
| 57759 ||  || — || November 9, 2001 || Socorro || LINEAR || SHU3:2 || align=right | 11 km || 
|-id=760 bgcolor=#d6d6d6
| 57760 ||  || — || November 9, 2001 || Socorro || LINEAR || THM || align=right | 5.4 km || 
|-id=761 bgcolor=#d6d6d6
| 57761 ||  || — || November 9, 2001 || Socorro || LINEAR || — || align=right | 4.5 km || 
|-id=762 bgcolor=#d6d6d6
| 57762 ||  || — || November 9, 2001 || Socorro || LINEAR || — || align=right | 6.5 km || 
|-id=763 bgcolor=#d6d6d6
| 57763 ||  || — || November 9, 2001 || Socorro || LINEAR || — || align=right | 9.1 km || 
|-id=764 bgcolor=#d6d6d6
| 57764 ||  || — || November 9, 2001 || Socorro || LINEAR || — || align=right | 4.0 km || 
|-id=765 bgcolor=#fefefe
| 57765 ||  || — || November 9, 2001 || Socorro || LINEAR || FLO || align=right | 2.4 km || 
|-id=766 bgcolor=#E9E9E9
| 57766 ||  || — || November 9, 2001 || Socorro || LINEAR || XIZ || align=right | 4.8 km || 
|-id=767 bgcolor=#d6d6d6
| 57767 ||  || — || November 9, 2001 || Socorro || LINEAR || — || align=right | 4.6 km || 
|-id=768 bgcolor=#d6d6d6
| 57768 ||  || — || November 9, 2001 || Socorro || LINEAR || — || align=right | 5.7 km || 
|-id=769 bgcolor=#E9E9E9
| 57769 ||  || — || November 9, 2001 || Socorro || LINEAR || — || align=right | 5.1 km || 
|-id=770 bgcolor=#E9E9E9
| 57770 ||  || — || November 9, 2001 || Socorro || LINEAR || NEM || align=right | 7.7 km || 
|-id=771 bgcolor=#E9E9E9
| 57771 ||  || — || November 9, 2001 || Socorro || LINEAR || — || align=right | 4.0 km || 
|-id=772 bgcolor=#fefefe
| 57772 ||  || — || November 10, 2001 || Socorro || LINEAR || — || align=right | 2.9 km || 
|-id=773 bgcolor=#fefefe
| 57773 ||  || — || November 10, 2001 || Socorro || LINEAR || — || align=right | 2.9 km || 
|-id=774 bgcolor=#E9E9E9
| 57774 ||  || — || November 10, 2001 || Socorro || LINEAR || — || align=right | 5.7 km || 
|-id=775 bgcolor=#fefefe
| 57775 ||  || — || November 10, 2001 || Socorro || LINEAR || — || align=right | 2.2 km || 
|-id=776 bgcolor=#fefefe
| 57776 ||  || — || November 10, 2001 || Socorro || LINEAR || — || align=right | 2.4 km || 
|-id=777 bgcolor=#d6d6d6
| 57777 ||  || — || November 10, 2001 || Socorro || LINEAR || EOS || align=right | 8.6 km || 
|-id=778 bgcolor=#fefefe
| 57778 ||  || — || November 10, 2001 || Socorro || LINEAR || — || align=right | 2.4 km || 
|-id=779 bgcolor=#E9E9E9
| 57779 ||  || — || November 11, 2001 || Socorro || LINEAR || — || align=right | 5.4 km || 
|-id=780 bgcolor=#fefefe
| 57780 ||  || — || November 12, 2001 || Haleakala || NEAT || V || align=right | 1.9 km || 
|-id=781 bgcolor=#fefefe
| 57781 ||  || — || November 9, 2001 || Palomar || NEAT || FLO || align=right | 1.6 km || 
|-id=782 bgcolor=#fefefe
| 57782 ||  || — || November 9, 2001 || Palomar || NEAT || — || align=right | 2.6 km || 
|-id=783 bgcolor=#d6d6d6
| 57783 ||  || — || November 9, 2001 || Palomar || NEAT || — || align=right | 4.0 km || 
|-id=784 bgcolor=#E9E9E9
| 57784 ||  || — || November 12, 2001 || Socorro || LINEAR || — || align=right | 3.1 km || 
|-id=785 bgcolor=#d6d6d6
| 57785 ||  || — || November 12, 2001 || Socorro || LINEAR || 628 || align=right | 4.4 km || 
|-id=786 bgcolor=#E9E9E9
| 57786 ||  || — || November 15, 2001 || Socorro || LINEAR || EUN || align=right | 3.2 km || 
|-id=787 bgcolor=#d6d6d6
| 57787 ||  || — || November 12, 2001 || Haleakala || NEAT || VER || align=right | 6.2 km || 
|-id=788 bgcolor=#fefefe
| 57788 ||  || — || November 12, 2001 || Haleakala || NEAT || — || align=right | 2.1 km || 
|-id=789 bgcolor=#d6d6d6
| 57789 ||  || — || November 15, 2001 || Socorro || LINEAR || — || align=right | 6.1 km || 
|-id=790 bgcolor=#E9E9E9
| 57790 ||  || — || November 15, 2001 || Socorro || LINEAR || — || align=right | 5.3 km || 
|-id=791 bgcolor=#E9E9E9
| 57791 ||  || — || November 15, 2001 || Socorro || LINEAR || — || align=right | 4.2 km || 
|-id=792 bgcolor=#E9E9E9
| 57792 ||  || — || November 15, 2001 || Socorro || LINEAR || EUN || align=right | 3.4 km || 
|-id=793 bgcolor=#d6d6d6
| 57793 ||  || — || November 15, 2001 || Socorro || LINEAR || — || align=right | 7.3 km || 
|-id=794 bgcolor=#d6d6d6
| 57794 ||  || — || November 15, 2001 || Socorro || LINEAR || ALA || align=right | 10 km || 
|-id=795 bgcolor=#E9E9E9
| 57795 ||  || — || November 15, 2001 || Socorro || LINEAR || — || align=right | 6.6 km || 
|-id=796 bgcolor=#E9E9E9
| 57796 ||  || — || November 15, 2001 || Socorro || LINEAR || MAR || align=right | 2.8 km || 
|-id=797 bgcolor=#E9E9E9
| 57797 ||  || — || November 15, 2001 || Socorro || LINEAR || — || align=right | 5.7 km || 
|-id=798 bgcolor=#E9E9E9
| 57798 ||  || — || November 12, 2001 || Socorro || LINEAR || — || align=right | 4.3 km || 
|-id=799 bgcolor=#E9E9E9
| 57799 ||  || — || November 12, 2001 || Socorro || LINEAR || — || align=right | 3.2 km || 
|-id=800 bgcolor=#d6d6d6
| 57800 ||  || — || November 12, 2001 || Socorro || LINEAR || — || align=right | 7.6 km || 
|}

57801–57900 

|-bgcolor=#d6d6d6
| 57801 ||  || — || November 12, 2001 || Socorro || LINEAR || — || align=right | 6.1 km || 
|-id=802 bgcolor=#d6d6d6
| 57802 ||  || — || November 12, 2001 || Socorro || LINEAR || HYG || align=right | 6.0 km || 
|-id=803 bgcolor=#E9E9E9
| 57803 ||  || — || November 12, 2001 || Socorro || LINEAR || — || align=right | 4.5 km || 
|-id=804 bgcolor=#E9E9E9
| 57804 ||  || — || November 12, 2001 || Socorro || LINEAR || — || align=right | 5.7 km || 
|-id=805 bgcolor=#d6d6d6
| 57805 ||  || — || November 12, 2001 || Socorro || LINEAR || KOR || align=right | 3.2 km || 
|-id=806 bgcolor=#fefefe
| 57806 ||  || — || November 15, 2001 || Palomar || NEAT || V || align=right | 1.8 km || 
|-id=807 bgcolor=#E9E9E9
| 57807 ||  || — || November 13, 2001 || Haleakala || NEAT || EUN || align=right | 3.9 km || 
|-id=808 bgcolor=#d6d6d6
| 57808 ||  || — || November 13, 2001 || Haleakala || NEAT || — || align=right | 7.9 km || 
|-id=809 bgcolor=#d6d6d6
| 57809 ||  || — || November 15, 2001 || Palomar || NEAT || — || align=right | 12 km || 
|-id=810 bgcolor=#E9E9E9
| 57810 || 2001 WC || — || November 16, 2001 || Oizumi || T. Kobayashi || — || align=right | 4.6 km || 
|-id=811 bgcolor=#d6d6d6
| 57811 ||  || — || November 17, 2001 || Socorro || LINEAR || — || align=right | 5.2 km || 
|-id=812 bgcolor=#fefefe
| 57812 ||  || — || November 17, 2001 || Socorro || LINEAR || — || align=right | 3.3 km || 
|-id=813 bgcolor=#d6d6d6
| 57813 ||  || — || November 18, 2001 || Socorro || LINEAR || — || align=right | 4.0 km || 
|-id=814 bgcolor=#E9E9E9
| 57814 ||  || — || November 17, 2001 || Socorro || LINEAR || PAD || align=right | 2.9 km || 
|-id=815 bgcolor=#fefefe
| 57815 ||  || — || November 17, 2001 || Socorro || LINEAR || FLO || align=right | 2.2 km || 
|-id=816 bgcolor=#d6d6d6
| 57816 ||  || — || November 17, 2001 || Socorro || LINEAR || — || align=right | 5.4 km || 
|-id=817 bgcolor=#fefefe
| 57817 ||  || — || November 17, 2001 || Socorro || LINEAR || — || align=right | 6.5 km || 
|-id=818 bgcolor=#fefefe
| 57818 ||  || — || November 17, 2001 || Socorro || LINEAR || V || align=right | 1.7 km || 
|-id=819 bgcolor=#d6d6d6
| 57819 ||  || — || November 17, 2001 || Socorro || LINEAR || — || align=right | 6.0 km || 
|-id=820 bgcolor=#E9E9E9
| 57820 ||  || — || November 17, 2001 || Socorro || LINEAR || RAF || align=right | 3.7 km || 
|-id=821 bgcolor=#d6d6d6
| 57821 ||  || — || November 18, 2001 || Socorro || LINEAR || — || align=right | 8.5 km || 
|-id=822 bgcolor=#fefefe
| 57822 ||  || — || November 19, 2001 || Socorro || LINEAR || NYS || align=right | 1.9 km || 
|-id=823 bgcolor=#E9E9E9
| 57823 ||  || — || November 16, 2001 || Palomar || NEAT || RAF || align=right | 2.6 km || 
|-id=824 bgcolor=#d6d6d6
| 57824 ||  || — || November 19, 2001 || Anderson Mesa || LONEOS || TEL || align=right | 3.5 km || 
|-id=825 bgcolor=#d6d6d6
| 57825 ||  || — || November 20, 2001 || Socorro || LINEAR || — || align=right | 5.4 km || 
|-id=826 bgcolor=#d6d6d6
| 57826 ||  || — || November 21, 2001 || Socorro || LINEAR || VER || align=right | 5.7 km || 
|-id=827 bgcolor=#E9E9E9
| 57827 ||  || — || November 21, 2001 || Socorro || LINEAR || — || align=right | 5.8 km || 
|-id=828 bgcolor=#d6d6d6
| 57828 ||  || — || December 9, 2001 || Uccle || T. Pauwels || — || align=right | 6.6 km || 
|-id=829 bgcolor=#E9E9E9
| 57829 ||  || — || December 9, 2001 || Socorro || LINEAR || — || align=right | 6.9 km || 
|-id=830 bgcolor=#d6d6d6
| 57830 ||  || — || December 9, 2001 || Socorro || LINEAR || EOS || align=right | 4.6 km || 
|-id=831 bgcolor=#E9E9E9
| 57831 ||  || — || December 9, 2001 || Socorro || LINEAR || — || align=right | 3.6 km || 
|-id=832 bgcolor=#fefefe
| 57832 ||  || — || December 9, 2001 || Socorro || LINEAR || — || align=right | 2.7 km || 
|-id=833 bgcolor=#E9E9E9
| 57833 ||  || — || December 10, 2001 || Socorro || LINEAR || HNS || align=right | 4.4 km || 
|-id=834 bgcolor=#d6d6d6
| 57834 ||  || — || December 10, 2001 || Socorro || LINEAR || ALA || align=right | 10 km || 
|-id=835 bgcolor=#d6d6d6
| 57835 ||  || — || December 9, 2001 || Socorro || LINEAR || EOS || align=right | 4.3 km || 
|-id=836 bgcolor=#d6d6d6
| 57836 ||  || — || December 9, 2001 || Socorro || LINEAR || — || align=right | 5.1 km || 
|-id=837 bgcolor=#d6d6d6
| 57837 ||  || — || December 14, 2001 || Socorro || LINEAR || EOS || align=right | 6.6 km || 
|-id=838 bgcolor=#d6d6d6
| 57838 ||  || — || December 10, 2001 || Socorro || LINEAR || — || align=right | 5.5 km || 
|-id=839 bgcolor=#fefefe
| 57839 ||  || — || December 10, 2001 || Socorro || LINEAR || MAS || align=right | 1.8 km || 
|-id=840 bgcolor=#E9E9E9
| 57840 ||  || — || December 10, 2001 || Socorro || LINEAR || — || align=right | 3.4 km || 
|-id=841 bgcolor=#fefefe
| 57841 ||  || — || December 10, 2001 || Socorro || LINEAR || FLO || align=right | 1.9 km || 
|-id=842 bgcolor=#d6d6d6
| 57842 ||  || — || December 10, 2001 || Socorro || LINEAR || HYG || align=right | 5.2 km || 
|-id=843 bgcolor=#fefefe
| 57843 ||  || — || December 10, 2001 || Socorro || LINEAR || V || align=right | 2.5 km || 
|-id=844 bgcolor=#d6d6d6
| 57844 ||  || — || December 10, 2001 || Socorro || LINEAR || — || align=right | 3.6 km || 
|-id=845 bgcolor=#d6d6d6
| 57845 ||  || — || December 11, 2001 || Socorro || LINEAR || TEL || align=right | 3.2 km || 
|-id=846 bgcolor=#d6d6d6
| 57846 ||  || — || December 11, 2001 || Socorro || LINEAR || EOS || align=right | 5.3 km || 
|-id=847 bgcolor=#d6d6d6
| 57847 ||  || — || December 11, 2001 || Socorro || LINEAR || — || align=right | 5.7 km || 
|-id=848 bgcolor=#E9E9E9
| 57848 ||  || — || December 11, 2001 || Socorro || LINEAR || — || align=right | 4.8 km || 
|-id=849 bgcolor=#d6d6d6
| 57849 ||  || — || December 11, 2001 || Socorro || LINEAR || — || align=right | 10 km || 
|-id=850 bgcolor=#fefefe
| 57850 ||  || — || December 10, 2001 || Socorro || LINEAR || NYS || align=right | 1.6 km || 
|-id=851 bgcolor=#d6d6d6
| 57851 ||  || — || December 10, 2001 || Socorro || LINEAR || — || align=right | 7.3 km || 
|-id=852 bgcolor=#fefefe
| 57852 ||  || — || December 10, 2001 || Socorro || LINEAR || — || align=right | 2.0 km || 
|-id=853 bgcolor=#E9E9E9
| 57853 ||  || — || December 10, 2001 || Socorro || LINEAR || — || align=right | 7.0 km || 
|-id=854 bgcolor=#E9E9E9
| 57854 ||  || — || December 14, 2001 || Socorro || LINEAR || — || align=right | 4.4 km || 
|-id=855 bgcolor=#E9E9E9
| 57855 ||  || — || December 14, 2001 || Socorro || LINEAR || EUN || align=right | 3.8 km || 
|-id=856 bgcolor=#E9E9E9
| 57856 ||  || — || December 11, 2001 || Socorro || LINEAR || — || align=right | 5.2 km || 
|-id=857 bgcolor=#fefefe
| 57857 ||  || — || December 11, 2001 || Socorro || LINEAR || V || align=right | 1.8 km || 
|-id=858 bgcolor=#fefefe
| 57858 ||  || — || December 11, 2001 || Socorro || LINEAR || V || align=right | 2.1 km || 
|-id=859 bgcolor=#d6d6d6
| 57859 ||  || — || December 11, 2001 || Socorro || LINEAR || — || align=right | 3.9 km || 
|-id=860 bgcolor=#E9E9E9
| 57860 ||  || — || December 13, 2001 || Socorro || LINEAR || HNA || align=right | 6.6 km || 
|-id=861 bgcolor=#d6d6d6
| 57861 ||  || — || December 15, 2001 || Socorro || LINEAR || THM || align=right | 5.8 km || 
|-id=862 bgcolor=#fefefe
| 57862 ||  || — || December 15, 2001 || Socorro || LINEAR || — || align=right | 2.1 km || 
|-id=863 bgcolor=#E9E9E9
| 57863 ||  || — || December 15, 2001 || Socorro || LINEAR || EUN || align=right | 3.2 km || 
|-id=864 bgcolor=#d6d6d6
| 57864 ||  || — || December 15, 2001 || Socorro || LINEAR || THM || align=right | 5.3 km || 
|-id=865 bgcolor=#d6d6d6
| 57865 ||  || — || December 15, 2001 || Socorro || LINEAR || KOR || align=right | 2.8 km || 
|-id=866 bgcolor=#E9E9E9
| 57866 ||  || — || December 15, 2001 || Socorro || LINEAR || — || align=right | 3.9 km || 
|-id=867 bgcolor=#E9E9E9
| 57867 ||  || — || December 7, 2001 || Socorro || LINEAR || — || align=right | 4.3 km || 
|-id=868 bgcolor=#fefefe
| 57868 Pupin || 2001 YD ||  || December 17, 2001 || Palomar || NEAT || ERIslow || align=right | 5.7 km || 
|-id=869 bgcolor=#E9E9E9
| 57869 ||  || — || December 18, 2001 || Socorro || LINEAR || — || align=right | 2.5 km || 
|-id=870 bgcolor=#d6d6d6
| 57870 ||  || — || December 18, 2001 || Socorro || LINEAR || URS || align=right | 8.8 km || 
|-id=871 bgcolor=#d6d6d6
| 57871 ||  || — || December 18, 2001 || Socorro || LINEAR || — || align=right | 6.1 km || 
|-id=872 bgcolor=#d6d6d6
| 57872 ||  || — || December 18, 2001 || Socorro || LINEAR || EUP || align=right | 9.6 km || 
|-id=873 bgcolor=#d6d6d6
| 57873 ||  || — || December 17, 2001 || Socorro || LINEAR || THB || align=right | 9.7 km || 
|-id=874 bgcolor=#fefefe
| 57874 ||  || — || December 18, 2001 || Anderson Mesa || LONEOS || PHO || align=right | 3.4 km || 
|-id=875 bgcolor=#d6d6d6
| 57875 ||  || — || December 20, 2001 || Haleakala || NEAT || — || align=right | 9.1 km || 
|-id=876 bgcolor=#E9E9E9
| 57876 ||  || — || December 17, 2001 || Socorro || LINEAR || — || align=right | 4.3 km || 
|-id=877 bgcolor=#fefefe
| 57877 ||  || — || December 17, 2001 || Socorro || LINEAR || V || align=right | 2.6 km || 
|-id=878 bgcolor=#FA8072
| 57878 ||  || — || December 18, 2001 || Anderson Mesa || LONEOS || — || align=right | 2.6 km || 
|-id=879 bgcolor=#E9E9E9
| 57879 Cesarechiosi ||  ||  || January 2, 2002 || Cima Ekar || ADAS || GEF || align=right | 2.8 km || 
|-id=880 bgcolor=#d6d6d6
| 57880 ||  || — || January 2, 2002 || Uccle || T. Pauwels || — || align=right | 7.1 km || 
|-id=881 bgcolor=#E9E9E9
| 57881 ||  || — || January 9, 2002 || Socorro || LINEAR || MAR || align=right | 4.1 km || 
|-id=882 bgcolor=#E9E9E9
| 57882 ||  || — || January 9, 2002 || Socorro || LINEAR || — || align=right | 5.7 km || 
|-id=883 bgcolor=#E9E9E9
| 57883 ||  || — || January 8, 2002 || Socorro || LINEAR || — || align=right | 6.2 km || 
|-id=884 bgcolor=#d6d6d6
| 57884 ||  || — || January 13, 2002 || Socorro || LINEAR || — || align=right | 10 km || 
|-id=885 bgcolor=#d6d6d6
| 57885 ||  || — || January 5, 2002 || Palomar || NEAT || — || align=right | 8.9 km || 
|-id=886 bgcolor=#d6d6d6
| 57886 ||  || — || January 6, 2002 || Palomar || NEAT || — || align=right | 6.4 km || 
|-id=887 bgcolor=#d6d6d6
| 57887 ||  || — || January 5, 2002 || Anderson Mesa || LONEOS || — || align=right | 5.5 km || 
|-id=888 bgcolor=#d6d6d6
| 57888 ||  || — || January 18, 2002 || Socorro || LINEAR || — || align=right | 8.8 km || 
|-id=889 bgcolor=#d6d6d6
| 57889 ||  || — || February 2, 2002 || Haleakala || NEAT || EUP || align=right | 9.4 km || 
|-id=890 bgcolor=#E9E9E9
| 57890 ||  || — || February 6, 2002 || Socorro || LINEAR || — || align=right | 4.6 km || 
|-id=891 bgcolor=#d6d6d6
| 57891 ||  || — || February 6, 2002 || Socorro || LINEAR || — || align=right | 12 km || 
|-id=892 bgcolor=#d6d6d6
| 57892 ||  || — || February 7, 2002 || Socorro || LINEAR || KOR || align=right | 3.8 km || 
|-id=893 bgcolor=#fefefe
| 57893 ||  || — || February 7, 2002 || Socorro || LINEAR || MAS || align=right | 1.8 km || 
|-id=894 bgcolor=#E9E9E9
| 57894 ||  || — || February 7, 2002 || Socorro || LINEAR || — || align=right | 3.6 km || 
|-id=895 bgcolor=#d6d6d6
| 57895 ||  || — || February 8, 2002 || Socorro || LINEAR || — || align=right | 7.7 km || 
|-id=896 bgcolor=#E9E9E9
| 57896 ||  || — || February 10, 2002 || Socorro || LINEAR || — || align=right | 2.4 km || 
|-id=897 bgcolor=#E9E9E9
| 57897 ||  || — || February 10, 2002 || Socorro || LINEAR || — || align=right | 7.2 km || 
|-id=898 bgcolor=#E9E9E9
| 57898 ||  || — || February 10, 2002 || Socorro || LINEAR || RAF || align=right | 4.0 km || 
|-id=899 bgcolor=#E9E9E9
| 57899 ||  || — || February 10, 2002 || Socorro || LINEAR || EUN || align=right | 3.5 km || 
|-id=900 bgcolor=#E9E9E9
| 57900 ||  || — || February 11, 2002 || Socorro || LINEAR || — || align=right | 3.1 km || 
|}

57901–58000 

|-bgcolor=#E9E9E9
| 57901 Hitchens ||  ||  || February 9, 2002 || Anderson Mesa || LONEOS || EUN || align=right | 5.9 km || 
|-id=902 bgcolor=#fefefe
| 57902 ||  || — || February 8, 2002 || Socorro || LINEAR || — || align=right | 3.0 km || 
|-id=903 bgcolor=#fefefe
| 57903 ||  || — || March 6, 2002 || Socorro || LINEAR || — || align=right | 2.3 km || 
|-id=904 bgcolor=#C2FFFF
| 57904 ||  || — || March 10, 2002 || Anderson Mesa || LONEOS || L4 || align=right | 22 km || 
|-id=905 bgcolor=#fefefe
| 57905 ||  || — || March 9, 2002 || Socorro || LINEAR || — || align=right | 2.1 km || 
|-id=906 bgcolor=#E9E9E9
| 57906 ||  || — || March 10, 2002 || Socorro || LINEAR || — || align=right | 5.7 km || 
|-id=907 bgcolor=#fefefe
| 57907 ||  || — || March 10, 2002 || Socorro || LINEAR || — || align=right | 4.9 km || 
|-id=908 bgcolor=#E9E9E9
| 57908 ||  || — || March 11, 2002 || Socorro || LINEAR || GEF || align=right | 4.1 km || 
|-id=909 bgcolor=#E9E9E9
| 57909 ||  || — || March 11, 2002 || Palomar || NEAT || EUN || align=right | 1.9 km || 
|-id=910 bgcolor=#C2FFFF
| 57910 ||  || — || March 13, 2002 || Socorro || LINEAR || L4 || align=right | 14 km || 
|-id=911 bgcolor=#fefefe
| 57911 ||  || — || March 15, 2002 || Socorro || LINEAR || — || align=right | 2.0 km || 
|-id=912 bgcolor=#E9E9E9
| 57912 ||  || — || March 3, 2002 || Haleakala || NEAT || — || align=right | 3.2 km || 
|-id=913 bgcolor=#fefefe
| 57913 ||  || — || March 9, 2002 || Anderson Mesa || LONEOS || LCI || align=right | 2.4 km || 
|-id=914 bgcolor=#fefefe
| 57914 ||  || — || March 9, 2002 || Kitt Peak || Spacewatch || — || align=right | 1.8 km || 
|-id=915 bgcolor=#C2FFFF
| 57915 ||  || — || March 9, 2002 || Catalina || CSS || L4 || align=right | 18 km || 
|-id=916 bgcolor=#E9E9E9
| 57916 ||  || — || March 9, 2002 || Anderson Mesa || LONEOS || — || align=right | 2.6 km || 
|-id=917 bgcolor=#fefefe
| 57917 ||  || — || March 9, 2002 || Catalina || CSS || V || align=right | 2.1 km || 
|-id=918 bgcolor=#fefefe
| 57918 ||  || — || March 10, 2002 || Haleakala || NEAT || — || align=right | 1.7 km || 
|-id=919 bgcolor=#E9E9E9
| 57919 ||  || — || March 13, 2002 || Socorro || LINEAR || — || align=right | 3.7 km || 
|-id=920 bgcolor=#C2FFFF
| 57920 ||  || — || March 15, 2002 || Kitt Peak || Spacewatch || L4 || align=right | 17 km || 
|-id=921 bgcolor=#E9E9E9
| 57921 ||  || — || March 10, 2002 || Haleakala || NEAT || — || align=right | 3.5 km || 
|-id=922 bgcolor=#E9E9E9
| 57922 ||  || — || March 16, 2002 || Socorro || LINEAR || — || align=right | 4.0 km || 
|-id=923 bgcolor=#E9E9E9
| 57923 ||  || — || March 16, 2002 || Socorro || LINEAR || — || align=right | 2.3 km || 
|-id=924 bgcolor=#FA8072
| 57924 ||  || — || March 20, 2002 || Socorro || LINEAR || — || align=right | 2.8 km || 
|-id=925 bgcolor=#fefefe
| 57925 ||  || — || March 20, 2002 || Socorro || LINEAR || — || align=right | 2.5 km || 
|-id=926 bgcolor=#d6d6d6
| 57926 ||  || — || March 20, 2002 || Anderson Mesa || LONEOS || — || align=right | 4.3 km || 
|-id=927 bgcolor=#E9E9E9
| 57927 ||  || — || April 3, 2002 || Kitt Peak || Spacewatch || — || align=right | 2.9 km || 
|-id=928 bgcolor=#E9E9E9
| 57928 ||  || — || April 9, 2002 || Anderson Mesa || LONEOS || PAD || align=right | 5.7 km || 
|-id=929 bgcolor=#fefefe
| 57929 ||  || — || April 10, 2002 || Socorro || LINEAR || V || align=right | 1.9 km || 
|-id=930 bgcolor=#fefefe
| 57930 ||  || — || April 9, 2002 || Socorro || LINEAR || V || align=right | 1.3 km || 
|-id=931 bgcolor=#fefefe
| 57931 ||  || — || April 14, 2002 || Palomar || NEAT || — || align=right | 3.0 km || 
|-id=932 bgcolor=#fefefe
| 57932 ||  || — || April 15, 2002 || Anderson Mesa || LONEOS || FLO || align=right | 1.7 km || 
|-id=933 bgcolor=#d6d6d6
| 57933 ||  || — || April 19, 2002 || Socorro || LINEAR || — || align=right | 6.6 km || 
|-id=934 bgcolor=#fefefe
| 57934 ||  || — || May 6, 2002 || Palomar || NEAT || V || align=right | 2.0 km || 
|-id=935 bgcolor=#d6d6d6
| 57935 ||  || — || May 7, 2002 || Palomar || NEAT || — || align=right | 5.1 km || 
|-id=936 bgcolor=#fefefe
| 57936 ||  || — || May 8, 2002 || Socorro || LINEAR || NYS || align=right | 1.5 km || 
|-id=937 bgcolor=#d6d6d6
| 57937 ||  || — || May 9, 2002 || Socorro || LINEAR || — || align=right | 7.5 km || 
|-id=938 bgcolor=#E9E9E9
| 57938 ||  || — || May 9, 2002 || Socorro || LINEAR || — || align=right | 3.7 km || 
|-id=939 bgcolor=#fefefe
| 57939 ||  || — || May 9, 2002 || Socorro || LINEAR || — || align=right | 2.0 km || 
|-id=940 bgcolor=#d6d6d6
| 57940 ||  || — || May 9, 2002 || Palomar || NEAT || — || align=right | 6.9 km || 
|-id=941 bgcolor=#d6d6d6
| 57941 ||  || — || May 7, 2002 || Socorro || LINEAR || — || align=right | 6.7 km || 
|-id=942 bgcolor=#fefefe
| 57942 ||  || — || May 8, 2002 || Socorro || LINEAR || — || align=right | 3.0 km || 
|-id=943 bgcolor=#fefefe
| 57943 ||  || — || May 8, 2002 || Socorro || LINEAR || V || align=right | 2.6 km || 
|-id=944 bgcolor=#E9E9E9
| 57944 ||  || — || May 9, 2002 || Socorro || LINEAR || — || align=right | 4.4 km || 
|-id=945 bgcolor=#fefefe
| 57945 ||  || — || May 9, 2002 || Socorro || LINEAR || — || align=right | 2.0 km || 
|-id=946 bgcolor=#fefefe
| 57946 ||  || — || May 8, 2002 || Socorro || LINEAR || — || align=right | 2.3 km || 
|-id=947 bgcolor=#E9E9E9
| 57947 ||  || — || May 8, 2002 || Socorro || LINEAR || — || align=right | 2.0 km || 
|-id=948 bgcolor=#d6d6d6
| 57948 ||  || — || May 8, 2002 || Socorro || LINEAR || — || align=right | 8.5 km || 
|-id=949 bgcolor=#fefefe
| 57949 ||  || — || May 10, 2002 || Socorro || LINEAR || NYS || align=right | 1.4 km || 
|-id=950 bgcolor=#d6d6d6
| 57950 ||  || — || May 8, 2002 || Socorro || LINEAR || VER || align=right | 6.7 km || 
|-id=951 bgcolor=#d6d6d6
| 57951 ||  || — || May 11, 2002 || Socorro || LINEAR || — || align=right | 4.9 km || 
|-id=952 bgcolor=#E9E9E9
| 57952 ||  || — || May 11, 2002 || Socorro || LINEAR || — || align=right | 3.2 km || 
|-id=953 bgcolor=#d6d6d6
| 57953 ||  || — || May 11, 2002 || Socorro || LINEAR || KOR || align=right | 3.0 km || 
|-id=954 bgcolor=#d6d6d6
| 57954 ||  || — || May 6, 2002 || Socorro || LINEAR || 7:4* || align=right | 18 km || 
|-id=955 bgcolor=#E9E9E9
| 57955 ||  || — || May 10, 2002 || Socorro || LINEAR || HEN || align=right | 2.1 km || 
|-id=956 bgcolor=#d6d6d6
| 57956 ||  || — || May 12, 2002 || Socorro || LINEAR || HYG || align=right | 6.4 km || 
|-id=957 bgcolor=#d6d6d6
| 57957 ||  || — || May 13, 2002 || Socorro || LINEAR || — || align=right | 5.3 km || 
|-id=958 bgcolor=#d6d6d6
| 57958 ||  || — || May 4, 2002 || Palomar || NEAT || AEG || align=right | 8.2 km || 
|-id=959 bgcolor=#fefefe
| 57959 ||  || — || May 5, 2002 || Palomar || NEAT || — || align=right | 2.8 km || 
|-id=960 bgcolor=#E9E9E9
| 57960 ||  || — || May 8, 2002 || Anderson Mesa || LONEOS || — || align=right | 3.2 km || 
|-id=961 bgcolor=#E9E9E9
| 57961 ||  || — || May 9, 2002 || Socorro || LINEAR || PAD || align=right | 6.1 km || 
|-id=962 bgcolor=#fefefe
| 57962 ||  || — || May 9, 2002 || Socorro || LINEAR || V || align=right | 1.3 km || 
|-id=963 bgcolor=#d6d6d6
| 57963 ||  || — || June 4, 2002 || Socorro || LINEAR || — || align=right | 6.4 km || 
|-id=964 bgcolor=#fefefe
| 57964 ||  || — || June 9, 2002 || Socorro || LINEAR || — || align=right | 2.1 km || 
|-id=965 bgcolor=#fefefe
| 57965 ||  || — || June 9, 2002 || Palomar || NEAT || — || align=right | 4.4 km || 
|-id=966 bgcolor=#fefefe
| 57966 ||  || — || June 10, 2002 || Socorro || LINEAR || FLO || align=right | 1.2 km || 
|-id=967 bgcolor=#fefefe
| 57967 ||  || — || June 6, 2002 || Kitt Peak || Spacewatch || V || align=right | 1.4 km || 
|-id=968 bgcolor=#d6d6d6
| 57968 ||  || — || June 7, 2002 || Palomar || NEAT || — || align=right | 9.9 km || 
|-id=969 bgcolor=#d6d6d6
| 57969 ||  || — || June 17, 2002 || Palomar || NEAT || — || align=right | 3.8 km || 
|-id=970 bgcolor=#d6d6d6
| 57970 ||  || — || July 4, 2002 || Palomar || NEAT || KOR || align=right | 3.4 km || 
|-id=971 bgcolor=#fefefe
| 57971 ||  || — || July 13, 2002 || Haleakala || NEAT || — || align=right | 2.7 km || 
|-id=972 bgcolor=#fefefe
| 57972 ||  || — || July 5, 2002 || Socorro || LINEAR || V || align=right | 1.3 km || 
|-id=973 bgcolor=#E9E9E9
| 57973 || 2002 OW || — || July 17, 2002 || Socorro || LINEAR || RAF || align=right | 2.7 km || 
|-id=974 bgcolor=#E9E9E9
| 57974 ||  || — || July 17, 2002 || Socorro || LINEAR || — || align=right | 6.9 km || 
|-id=975 bgcolor=#E9E9E9
| 57975 ||  || — || July 16, 2002 || Palomar || NEAT || KON || align=right | 4.9 km || 
|-id=976 bgcolor=#fefefe
| 57976 ||  || — || July 18, 2002 || Socorro || LINEAR || V || align=right | 1.4 km || 
|-id=977 bgcolor=#E9E9E9
| 57977 ||  || — || August 6, 2002 || Palomar || NEAT || — || align=right | 4.7 km || 
|-id=978 bgcolor=#d6d6d6
| 57978 ||  || — || August 6, 2002 || Palomar || NEAT || THM || align=right | 3.8 km || 
|-id=979 bgcolor=#d6d6d6
| 57979 ||  || — || August 10, 2002 || Socorro || LINEAR || THM || align=right | 7.1 km || 
|-id=980 bgcolor=#fefefe
| 57980 ||  || — || August 13, 2002 || Socorro || LINEAR || — || align=right | 1.6 km || 
|-id=981 bgcolor=#E9E9E9
| 57981 ||  || — || August 12, 2002 || Socorro || LINEAR || — || align=right | 2.6 km || 
|-id=982 bgcolor=#fefefe
| 57982 ||  || — || August 13, 2002 || Socorro || LINEAR || — || align=right | 4.8 km || 
|-id=983 bgcolor=#E9E9E9
| 57983 ||  || — || August 12, 2002 || Haleakala || NEAT || — || align=right | 3.0 km || 
|-id=984 bgcolor=#d6d6d6
| 57984 ||  || — || August 13, 2002 || Kitt Peak || Spacewatch || KOR || align=right | 2.7 km || 
|-id=985 bgcolor=#d6d6d6
| 57985 ||  || — || August 15, 2002 || Palomar || NEAT || — || align=right | 3.5 km || 
|-id=986 bgcolor=#E9E9E9
| 57986 ||  || — || August 14, 2002 || Socorro || LINEAR || — || align=right | 4.2 km || 
|-id=987 bgcolor=#E9E9E9
| 57987 ||  || — || August 19, 2002 || Kvistaberg || UDAS || — || align=right | 2.1 km || 
|-id=988 bgcolor=#E9E9E9
| 57988 ||  || — || September 5, 2002 || Socorro || LINEAR || — || align=right | 4.6 km || 
|-id=989 bgcolor=#E9E9E9
| 57989 ||  || — || September 4, 2002 || Anderson Mesa || LONEOS || — || align=right | 5.4 km || 
|-id=990 bgcolor=#E9E9E9
| 57990 ||  || — || September 4, 2002 || Anderson Mesa || LONEOS || — || align=right | 3.1 km || 
|-id=991 bgcolor=#d6d6d6
| 57991 ||  || — || September 5, 2002 || Socorro || LINEAR || — || align=right | 7.2 km || 
|-id=992 bgcolor=#fefefe
| 57992 ||  || — || September 5, 2002 || Socorro || LINEAR || NYS || align=right | 1.8 km || 
|-id=993 bgcolor=#E9E9E9
| 57993 ||  || — || September 5, 2002 || Anderson Mesa || LONEOS || HNA || align=right | 4.7 km || 
|-id=994 bgcolor=#d6d6d6
| 57994 ||  || — || September 5, 2002 || Socorro || LINEAR || URS || align=right | 8.6 km || 
|-id=995 bgcolor=#fefefe
| 57995 ||  || — || September 5, 2002 || Socorro || LINEAR || — || align=right | 2.4 km || 
|-id=996 bgcolor=#fefefe
| 57996 ||  || — || September 5, 2002 || Socorro || LINEAR || — || align=right | 2.3 km || 
|-id=997 bgcolor=#fefefe
| 57997 ||  || — || September 6, 2002 || Socorro || LINEAR || FLO || align=right | 1.6 km || 
|-id=998 bgcolor=#d6d6d6
| 57998 ||  || — || September 27, 2002 || Palomar || NEAT || — || align=right | 5.7 km || 
|-id=999 bgcolor=#d6d6d6
| 57999 ||  || — || October 2, 2002 || Socorro || LINEAR || — || align=right | 6.5 km || 
|-id=000 bgcolor=#E9E9E9
| 58000 ||  || — || October 4, 2002 || Socorro || LINEAR || — || align=right | 7.7 km || 
|}

References

External links 
 Discovery Circumstances: Numbered Minor Planets (55001)–(60000) (IAU Minor Planet Center)

0057